= The Christmas Lunch Incident =

- The Vicar of Dibley episode
- Episode no.: Episode 8
- Directed by: Gareth Carrivick
- Written by: Richard Curtis; Paul Mayhew-Archer
- Editing by: Mykola Pawluk; Steve Tempia
- Original air date: 25 December 1996
- Running time: 45 minutes

Guest appearances
- Mel Giedroyc as Mary Tinker; Carol MacReady as Mrs. Tinker; Peter Capaldi as Tristan Campbell; Orla Brady as Aoife

Episode chronology
← Previous "The Easter Bunny"	Next → "Ballykissdibley"

"The Christmas Lunch Incident" is a Christmas special episode of the British television sitcom The Vicar of Dibley. The episode was first broadcast on BBC1 in the United Kingdom on 25 December 1996. It was the eighth episode of The Vicar of Dibley to be produced and transmitted. Repeats are broadcast regularly around Christmas on both the original channel and more frequently on the UKTV comedy channel U&Gold. The episode was written by regular writers Richard Curtis and Paul Mayhew-Archer.

== Plot ==
The episode depicts the show's central character, Vicar and parish council member Geraldine Granger (Dawn French), spending her second Christmas in the village of Dibley. Firstly, she needs to produce a sermon for the festive season that is more interesting than last year's as it will be, according to David Horton, the "keynote speech at the party conference" and members are "back to Satanism" if the sermon is not received well. She produces several drafts, which she either rejects herself or reads to her villagers, who quickly lose interest. After a long struggle for ideas, she successfully writes one in time for the Christmas church service using a Spice Girls biography book given to her by her friend and verger Alice Tinker (Emma Chambers) as a Christmas present.

The vicar is also invited to attend four Christmas lunches; the first she happily accepts and reluctantly accepts the next three as she does not want to disappoint or offend those offering who are relying on her attendance. The first one is with two of her fellow parish council members, Frank Pickle (John Bluthal) and Jim Trott (Trevor Peacock). The next one is with David Horton (Gary Waldhorn) and his son Hugo (James Fleet). The third is with Alice, her mother (Carol MacReady) and her more dim-witted sister Mary (Mel Giedroyc). The fourth is offered to her, after she has attended the other three, by the remaining parish council member, Owen Newitt (Roger Lloyd-Pack); he initially told the vicar he was not going to invite her, much to her relief, but he mistook her joy as a subtle way of asking to join him for lunch.

Granger realises that she will need to ask for small portions at the first meal to preserve her appetite; despite asking, she is presented with turkey slices and sixteen types of vegetables. She finishes this and is presented with a whole Christmas pudding to eat, which she initially thinks is for the three to share. Now starting to feel full, she goes to the second, where David uses recipes from a Delia Smith book. He presents her with a large plate of pasta, then a whole fish and finally the turkey. After initially declining David's offer of more Brussels sprouts, she reluctantly accepts as it is a competition between him and Hugo as to who eats more sprouts, David or the guest (representing Hugo), she gives Hugo his first win against his father in any competition. Now completely full up, she crawls to Alice's house and tries to get Alice and her family to offer her just a cup of tea by telling a fictionalised version of the events she has been through. This, however, fails when Alice - who seems to know what Granger is trying to do - replies that if the vicar from the "story" had already eaten after Alice had cooked her a meal, she would be traumatised. Mrs Tinker serves her balls of stuffing as a starter and a main course. After the third meal, the vicar gets a cab home (which is just opposite Alice's). Newitt then arrives, offering her the fourth lunch, and she reluctantly goes with him where he serves a large selection of food, including tripe, all of which is offered to her as Newitt has a stomach upset. The vicar is finally given a lift home in the bucket of his tractor.

Whilst at home resting from all the food she has consumed, Tristian Campbell (Peter Capaldi), the producer who worked on Songs of Praise in Dibley, knocks at Granger's door. He asks her, "Will you marry me?" which she mistakes as a marriage proposal and says yes. He leaves with both of them happy, but he returns with his fiancée Aoife (Orla Brady), and Granger realises Campbell meant he wanted her to conduct the ceremony and not be the bride. A while later the villagers she had lunches with – apart from Mrs and Mary Tinker – arrive at the vicarage to play charades. Hugo gives a speech culminating in a toast to the vicar, who is suffering from indigestion in her toilet.

== Cultural references ==
The vicar tells Alice that for Christmas, she is most looking forward to seeing Jurassic Park and The Queen's Christmas Message (Elizabeth II in this instance); the former is also mentioned by Hugo who feels sorry for people who are lonely and watch it as entertainment over Christmas. Alice tells the vicar that Only Fools and Horses is more entertaining than the story of Jesus' birth as the latter lacks comedy, adding "that Rodney, what a plonker". Jim tells the vicar a knock-knock joke where the punchline is Doctor Who. During the sprout eating contest, Hugo introduces the vicar and his father in the style of John Anderson on Gladiators. During charades, Alice holds up two jars believing she is acting out a film called Jars; the others realise she is trying to do Jaws.

== Reception ==
In 2014 television critics for the Radio Times listed their top ten Christmas television moments, the episode came in seventh place.

On 22 December 2018, BBC One aired the episode in memory of John Bluthal (Frank Pickle), who died in November 2018. This was similar to when fellow Dibley cast member Emma Chambers (Alice Tinker) died in February 2018, when the episode "Love and Marriage" was aired in her memory.

== See also ==
- 1996 in British television
- List of The Vicar of Dibley episodes
- List of Christmas television episodes and specials in the United Kingdom
