= Geraldine Granger =

Central character in BBC sitcom The Vicar of Dibley

- The Vicar of Dibley character
- Dawn French as Geraldine Granger
- First appearance: "The Arrival"; 10 November 1994
- Last appearance: "The Vicar of Dibley in Lockdown" 23 December 2020
- Portrayed by: Dawn French

In-universe information
- Occupation: Vicar
- Spouse: Harry Kennedy (from 2006)
- Significant other: Simon Horton (1998–99)

Geraldine Granger is a fictional female vicar, the central character of the successful British BBC sitcom The Vicar of Dibley. She is portrayed by Dawn French, described by the British Comedy Guide as "the jolly, down-to-earth female vicar of Dibley, a small country village inhabited by oddballs. After overcoming the town's initial shock at her gender Geraldine helps to improve the village." Much of the source of comedy comes from the way French plays the female vicar with her extroverted and fun-loving nature, frequent colourful language, and behaviour as a vicar which would usually be frowned on by the church.

The character made her debut in 1994 and has been reprised several times after the conclusion of the series in 2007. Several of these appearances have been in sketches for Comic Relief, most recently as part of the Comic Relief/Children in Need Big Night In fundraising event during the COVID-19 epidemic. French also reprised the character on 15 March 2013 for a French and Saunders marathon on BBC Radio 2, 29 March 2014 for Thought for the Day on BBC Radio 4, and in December 2020 for three Vicar of Dibley in Lockdown shorts aired on BBC One.

== Character ==
Granger introduced herself to a shocked parish council, leading her to remark: "You were expecting a bloke - beard, bible, bad breath. And instead, you got a babe with a bob cut and a magnificent bosom." She is a bonne vivante and a liberal woman who enjoys nothing more than a good laugh, much to the consternation of her primary antagonist David Horton (Gary Waldhorn). Despite her fun-loving and sometimes outrageous behaviour, she is deeply caring and does her best to help those in her parish in any way she can. She is well aware of her obesity but seems to take a relatively laid-back attitude toward it. A self-confessed chocoholic, her favourites being Crunchie, Smarties and Curly Wurlys, she has innumerable chocolate bars hidden throughout her house (even in hollowed-out Bibles). On one occasion, she gives up chocolate for Lent and nearly goes mad but does succeed. She has an enormous crush on actor Sean Bean. She is a Labour supporter.

Despite her kind-hearted nature, Geraldine is not above occasional arrogance. In the second-season episode "Celebrity Vicar", after a spot on local radio led to several high-profile media appearances, Geraldine allowed fame to go to her head becoming overconfident and self-centred, caring more about her public image and TV career than about her parishioners or her duties as a vicar. She was later humbled after the tabloids printed several offensive articles about the members of the village council and she struggled to regain their trust.

Her unusual first name Boadicea is revealed later in the series, much to David Horton's amusement, although in the final episode her full name is given as Geraldine Julie Andrews Dick van Dyke Supercalifragilisticexpialidocious Chim-Chiminey Chim-Chiminey Chim-Chim-Cheree Granger, the latter due to her mother's favourite book being Mary Poppins and the fact that the film was released in 1964, supposedly the year of Geraldine's birth. Geraldine celebrated her 40th birthday in an episode first broadcast on 1 January 2005. Dawn French was already 47 at the time.

Her best friend is Alice Tinker (Emma Chambers); at the end of each episode she tells a joke to Alice, but Alice rarely understands the humour. Geraldine was once going to marry David Horton but upon reflection decided against this. In 2006, she receives a proposal from accountant Harry Kennedy and accepts by running around the village, screaming. In the final episode she marries him in a bizarre wedding with touches of Doctor Who, including the two bridesmaids being dressed as Daleks and with parts of the church decorated with vegetables. She ends up getting married in her pyjamas because her wedding dress has been accidentally covered with mud by Owen Newitt (Roger Lloyd-Pack) driving a car through a puddle.

== See also ==
- List of The Vicar of Dibley characters
