= An Actor's Life For Me =

- Genre: Sitcom
- Starring: John Gordon Sinclair; Caroline Quentin; Gina McKee; Gary Waldhorn; Victor Spinetti; Benedict Taylor
- Country of origin: United Kingdom
- Original language: English
- No. of series: 1
- No. of episodes: 6

Production
- Running time: 30 minutes

Original release
- Network: BBC1
- Release: 14 November – 19 December 1991

An Actor's Life For Me is a British sitcom that aired on BBC Radio 2 from 1989 to 1993 and on BBC1 in 1991. Starring John Gordon Sinclair, Caroline Quentin and Gina McKee, it was written by Paul Mayhew-Archer, who later co-wrote The Vicar of Dibley.

== Cast ==
=== Radio ===
- John Gordon Sinclair – Robert Wilson
- Caroline Quentin – Sue Bishop (Series 1 and 2)
- Gina McKee – Sue Bishop (Series 3)
- Gary Waldhorn – Desmond Shaw

=== Television ===
- John Gordon-Sinclair – Robert Neilson
- Gina McKee – Sue Bishop
- Victor Spinetti – Desmond Shaw
- Benedict Taylor – Sebastian Groom
- Sophie Dix – Stage Manager

== Plot ==
An Actor's Life For Me is based around Robert Wilson/Neilson, an actor who believes he is about to make it big time. While he never achieves his quest for fame, he always remains optimistic that he will do at the next audition. His girlfriend, Sue Bishop, and agent Desmond Shaw do their best to keep his feet on the ground.

The final episode of the TV series ends with Sue's father (John Woodvine) being humiliated as a result of Robert's new risque play and a misunderstanding with the police. As a result of this, Sue walks out on Robert.

== Television episodes ==
1. "A Kiss Is Just a Kiss" (14 November 1991)
2. "I Can Do That" (21 November 1991)
3. "Fathers and Sons" (28 November 1991)
4. "May the Farce Be With You" (5 December 1991)
5. "Night of the Living Dead" (12 December 1991)
6. "Not Suitable For Parents" (19 December 1991)

== Radio series ==
An Actor's Life For Me aired on BBC Radio 2 for three series. The first series of seven episodes aired from 20 January to 3 March 1989. The second series had six episodes and ran from 11 February to 18 March 1990. The third and final series also had six episodes and ran from 5 January to 9 February 1993. An unaired pilot had previously been recorded several years before. It starred Nicholas Lyndhurst and Peter Jones in the roles that were subsequently played by John Gordon-Sinclair and Gary Waldhorn.

The first series was rebroadcast on BBC Radio 7 in July 2007, with a full series repeat (all 19 episodes) from April 2009 on the same network. It has subsequently been repeated several times on BBC Radio4 Extra, in June 2021 (Series 1), October 2021 (Series 2) and January 2022 (Series 3), and again commencing in October 2026.

Series 1

Ep1 – A Stiff Audition

Ep2 – I Can Do That

Ep3 – Not Suitable for Parents

Ep4 – Separate Troubles

Ep5 – Educating Robert

Ep6 – May The Farce By With You

Ep7 – Pantomime Cows

Series 2

Ep1 – The Scottish Play

Ep2 – Fathers & Sons

Ep3 – Heart Throbs

Ep4 – Up on the Roof

Ep5 – Puppets

Ep6 – Read All About it

Series 3

Ep1 – Here's looking at you

Ep2 – Politics

Ep3 – Police Farce

Ep4 – Madness in his Method

Ep5 – Fatal Distraction

Ep6 – Neighbours
