= List of The Vicar of Dibley episodes =

The Vicar of Dibley is a British television sitcom, created and written by Richard Curtis, and produced by Tiger Aspect Productions for BBC One. It stars Dawn French as Geraldine Granger, the first-ever female vicar assigned to the position in the small Oxfordshire village of Dibley.

During the course of the programme, 20 episodes of The Vicar of Dibley aired, including six specials over three series, between 10 November 1994 and 1 January 2007. In addition, outside of the series, there have been seven charity specials and four "lockdown" specials.

== Series overview ==
Series
Series	Episodes	Originally released		Ave. UK viewers (millions)
Series	Episodes	First released	Last released	Ave. UK viewers (millions)
1	6	10 November 1994	15 December 1994	TBA
Specials		8 April 1996	25 December 1996	TBA
2	4	26 December 1997	22 January 1998	TBA
3	4	24 December 1999	1 January 2000	13.53
Specials		25 December 2004	1 January 2005	12.05
Specials		25 December 2006	1 January 2007	12.74

== Episodes ==
=== Series 1 (1994) ===
No. overall	No. in series	Title	Directed by	Written by	Running time	Original release date
1	1	"The Arrival"	Dewi Humphreys	Richard Curtis	28 minutes	10 November 1994
When Reverend Pottle, the 102-year-old vicar of Dibley, dies, the villagers eagerly await his replacement. To their shock, the replacement vicar is a woman. While David Horton tries to have her removed, the other villagers grow to love their new vicar. First appearance of Alice Tinker, David Horton, Hugo Horton, Owen Newitt, Frank Pickle, Jim Trott, Letitia Cropley and Geraldine Granger
2	2	"Songs of Praise"	Dewi Humphreys	Richard Curtis and Kit Hesketh-Harvey	29 minutes	17 November 1994
The Songs of Praise team come to Dibley to film in St. Barnabas' Church. The townsfolk all want to be involved, while Geraldine falls for the show's producer Tristan Campbell (played by Peter Capaldi), and David, meanwhile, becomes enamoured of Ruth, the camera operator. However, on the evening filming is wrapped, Geraldine and David are heartbroken to discover that Tristan and Ruth are in a relationship. Guest starring Pam Rhodes as herself. First appearance of Tristan Campbell, Doris Trott, Gonads and Cecil
3	3	"Community Spirit"	Dewi Humphreys	Richard Curtis and Paul Mayhew-Archer	28 minutes	24 November 1994
The Dibley village fête is approaching and Geraldine is determined to raise more than the £270 taken the previous year. When Alice says she has a second cousin named Reg Dwight (played by Philip Whitchurch), Geraldine invites him thinking he is Elton John. Guest starring Kylie Minogue as herself.
4	4	"The Window and the Weather"	Dewi Humphreys	Richard Curtis	29 minutes	1 December 1994
One of the church's stained glass windows is destroyed during a storm. While everyone struggles to remember what the window depicted, David points out it will cost £11,000 to replace. The vicar then pursues one of David's wealthy friends, Daniel Frobisher (Nicholas Le Prevost), trying to persuade him to donate the money.
5	5	"Election"	Dewi Humphreys	Richard Curtis and Paul Mayhew-Archer	29 minutes	8 December 1994
David stands for re-election to the local council but faces competition when the villagers declare that they want the vicar to run. She agrees not to stand as long as David makes a few election promises. Featuring the voice of Alistair McGowan. Last appearance of Doris Trott
6	6	"Animals"	Dewi Humphreys	Richard Curtis	29 minutes	15 December 1994
As Alice wonders whether I Can't Believe It's Not Butter might actually be butter, Geraldine is visited by a distraught villager whose pet has died. Moved by how much people love their animal friends, Geraldine plans a special service for all the animals of the village, to be held in the church. However, when this attracts tabloid interest, David's wrath is incurred and he again attempts to have Geraldine removed. Guest starring Moray Watson.

=== Specials (1996) ===
No. overall	Title	Directed by	Written by	Running time	Original release date
7	"The Easter Bunny"	John Howard Davies	Richard Curtis and Paul Mayhew-Archer	38 minutes	8 April 1996
As Easter comes to Dibley, each council member gives up something for Lent: Geraldine gives up chocolate, David stops being unpleasant, Hugo forgoes lustful thoughts, Owen stops swearing, Letitia stops "cooking garbage", Frank stops being tiresome and Jim stops dithering. Sadness later comes to Dibley when Letitia dies, and Geraldine promises to take over her role as the Dibley Easter Bunny, which involves dressing up in a rabbit costume. Last appearance of Letitia Cropley
8	"The Christmas Lunch Incident"	Gareth Carrivick	Richard Curtis and Paul Mayhew-Archer	43 minutes	25 December 1996
When Geraldine is invited to four separate Christmas dinners, she does not have the heart to refuse any so goes to all four. On Christmas night she is visited by Songs of Praise producer Tristan Campbell, who asks her to marry him. Geraldine is overwhelmed until he introduces his fiancée (played by Orla Brady), and it becomes apparent that he wants her to conduct his wedding. Guest starring Mel Giedroyc as Alice's sister and Carol MacReady as Alice's mother. Last appearance of Tristan Campbell

=== Series 2 (1997–1998) ===
No. overall	No. in series	Title	Directed by	Written by	Running time	Original release date
9	1	"Engagement"	Dewi Humphreys	Richard Curtis and Paul Mayhew-Archer	39 minutes	26 December 1997
After growing tired of Alice and Hugo failing to act on their mutual attraction, Geraldine decides to play Cupid. It goes better than she hoped and the two become a couple, but when David finds out they are seeing each other he threatens to disinherit Hugo. Meanwhile, after Geraldine gives Owen his very first kiss out of pity, he proposes marriage, much to her dismay.
10	2	"Dibley Live"	Dewi Humphreys	Paul Mayhew-Archer and Richard Curtis	28 minutes	8 January 1998
To mark the 650th anniversary of St. Barnabus' Church, the villagers set up a radio station for a week, and Geraldine holds a competition for the best DJ. Frank comes out as gay during his turn as DJ, but only Geraldine is listening. Alice competes against David in the village quiz.
11	3	"Celebrity Vicar"	Dewi Humphreys	Paul Mayhew-Archer and Richard Curtis	28 minutes	15 January 1998
Following the success of Radio Dibley, Geraldine is interviewed in The Times newspaper and invited to appear on Pause for Thought with Terry Wogan, where she meets ballerina Darcey Bussell. As media opportunities keep pouring in, fame goes to her head with unfortunate consequences for the other villagers. After humiliating her village in front of the nation, a humbled Geraldine tries to set things right.
12	4	"Love and Marriage"	Dewi Humphreys	Paul Mayhew-Archer and Richard Curtis	29 minutes	22 January 1998
Alice and Hugo's wedding is approaching, with Jim as best man and children dressed as Teletubbies. Meanwhile, Geraldine is attracted to David's brother from Liverpool, Simon (played by Clive Mantle). During her hen night, Alice also reveals the shocking identity of her biological father. Guest starring Geraldine McNulty. First appearance of Simon Horton

=== Series 3 – The Seasonal Specials (1999–2000) ===
The BBC lists the following four episodes as forming Series 3 on its website, whilst the DVD box set lists them simply as "The Seasonal Specials".

No. overall	No. in series	Title	Directed by	Written by	Running time	Original release date	UK viewers (millions)
13	1	"Autumn"	Gareth Carrivick	Paul Mayhew-Archer and Richard Curtis	39 minutes	24 December 1999	13.08
Hugo and Alice return from their honeymoon, and Alice is pregnant. Meanwhile, David's brother Simon returns, and he and Geraldine begin a passionate relationship. However, when he says he is seeing another woman back in Liverpool, she is so devastated that she refuses to attend any services and offers her resignation. Last appearance of Simon Horton
14	2	"Winter"	Gareth Carrivick	Paul Mayhew-Archer and Richard Curtis	39 minutes	25 December 1999	14.17
With the millennium approaching, Geraldine wants to organise a Christmas show that no one will forget, and Alice suggests recreating the Nativity at a real farm. At the event, at Owen's farm, Alice plays Mary and gives birth in the middle of the performance. They name her Geraldine in honour of the vicar.
15	3	"Spring"	Gareth Carrivick	Paul Mayhew-Archer and Richard Curtis	39 minutes	27 December 1999	14.37
The Bishop of Mulberry is to officiate at the christening of Alice and Hugo's baby. Geraldine and Owen are to be the godparents, while Frank and Jim act as god-grandparents. As David thinks about how he misjudged Geraldine when she arrived, he decides they are well-matched and asks her to marry him. When David goes to some considerable lengths to demonstrate that he is prepared to change himself for Geraldine, she is swept away by his declaration of love and ends up accepting. However, after Geraldine has a dream of her celebrity crush, she quickly regrets accepting David's proposal and tries to extricate herself from the situation without hurting David's feelings. Guest starring Sean Bean as himself, Richard Griffiths and Nina Wadia
16	4	"Summer"	Gareth Carrivick	Paul Mayhew-Archer and Richard Curtis	39 minutes	1 January 2000	12.49
Dibley is in the middle of a drought, and the water company decides to solve the problem by turning Dibley into a reservoir. Geraldine chains herself to the church in protest but initially finds little support from the rest of the villagers when the water company makes lucrative offers to encourage them to vacate. Meanwhile, the villagers want to build a millennium statue. Guest starring Martyn Lewis, Jeremy Paxman and Roger Sloman.

=== A Very Dibley Christmas (2004–05) ===
No. overall	Title	Directed by	Written by	Running time	Original release date	UK viewers (millions)
17	"Merry Christmas"	Martin Dennis	Richard Curtis and Paul Mayhew-Archer	53 minutes	25 December 2004	12.52
It is Geraldine's 10th Christmas in Dibley, and to celebrate they hold a competition to see who can write the best Christmas carol. Meanwhile, at a party to celebrate her anniversary, David invites the Archbishop of Canterbury, Rowan Williams (played by Brian Perkins). Following a discussion between Alice and Geraldine about who they would want to sleep with if they were gay, Alice then informs the parish council that Geraldine is gay when she sees a nearly naked Rachel Hunter in the vicarage. After her anniversary party goes badly, Geraldine drinks three bottles of wine before midnight mass. Last appearance of Cecil
18	"Happy New Year"	Martin Dennis	Richard Curtis and Paul Mayhew-Archer	47 minutes	1 January 2005	11.57
The villagers want to celebrate Geraldine's 40th birthday, so they buy her a ticket to a speed dating evening. However, when she goes it turns out that most of the dates are the other villagers. When Geraldine leaves without a date, Hugo offers to sleep with her and impregnate her so she can have a baby, revealing that he and Alice now have ten children. Meanwhile, Geraldine is trying to get the villagers enthusiastic about the 20th anniversary of Live Aid and encourages them to write to the Prime Minister about the Make Poverty History campaign. However, when they show no interest, she shows them a short video depicting two poverty-stricken children, and the episode concludes with all of them wearing armbands in support of the campaign. Guest starring Miranda Hart, Nathalie Cox and Cristian Solimeno as organiser and participants in the speed dating respectively. This episode did not display full end credits of cast and crew, although the actors were all given an onscreen credit at the beginning of the programme. Geraldine tells a joke to Alice at the start of the episode, instead of at the end.

=== A Wholly Holy Happy Ending (2006–07) ===
No. overall	Title	Directed by	Written by	Running time	Original release date	UK viewers (millions)
19	"The Handsome Stranger"	Ed Bye	Richard Curtis and Paul Mayhew-Archer	53 minutes	25 December 2006	12.39
Concerned that Dibley is losing its community feel, Geraldine starts an art class and a book club. Neither are very successful as everyone gets distracted by the life model and nobody is interested in the book. After reading The Da Vinci Code, Alice thinks that as her name rhymes with "chalice" she must be descended from Jesus. Annoyed by yet another "townie" moving into the village, Geraldine goes round to see the newcomer, Harry Kennedy (played by Richard Armitage). Both instantly feel a mutual attraction, but Geraldine is troubled when she sees him with an attractive woman called Rosie (played by Keeley Hawes). When Harry asks Geraldine to marry him, she initially thinks he wants her to conduct his marriage to Rosie. Geraldine is shocked, and then elated, to discover that Harry wants to marry Geraldine, and that Rosie is his sister.
20	"The Vicar in White"	Ed Bye	Richard Curtis and Paul Mayhew-Archer	55 minutes	1 January 2007	13.08
Having officiated at 100 weddings, Geraldine is excited to finally be the bride. Harry sensitively leaves her alone to research dresses, but the parishioners invade, taking over all the organisation as a thank you gift for Geraldine's decade of friendship. Hugo presents a disastrous This Is Your Life, but the evening is saved when a power cut gives the group opportunity to simply chat and show their appreciation for each other. Before the wedding, Owen, Jim and Rev Jeremy Ogilvy (played by Hugh Bonneville), an old college friend whom Geraldine has chosen to conduct the service, all propose to her. After a number of setbacks, the bride looks beautiful in her white dress until Owen drives the car through a muddy puddle. Geraldine attends the ceremony in her pyjamas – Harry's favourite pair – with Alice dressed as the Tenth Doctor and Dalek bridesmaids. As the newly married Harry and Geraldine leave the service, she flies up into the sky above Dibley, overcome with joy. Last appearance of Gonads and Rosie

== Other media ==
=== Comic Relief Specials ===
No. overall	Title	Duration	Viewers	Airdate
1	"Ballykissdibley"	11 minutes	TBA	14 March 1997
In a vicar exchange programme, Father Peter Clifford (Stephen Tompkinson) from Ballykissangel comes to Dibley to face Alice's bizarre charity ideas and Owen's swearing.
2	"Celebrity Party"	14 minutes	TBA	12 March 1999
When a Johnny Depp movie shoots in Dibley, Geraldine graciously invites Depp and the other celebrities in tow to a party at the vicarage. Alice starts preparing for the party but does not realise she has her dress on back to front. The party begins, and so Depp comes round with a host of celebrity friends, including Madonna; the Duchess of York; and Robin Cook (who, it transpires, kissed Geraldine). Because the whole party occurred in the dark, David does not believe that the party actually happened; he says the next day that he thought Depp brought round a couple of impersonators instead in order to fool Geraldine. He is quickly corrected and leaves absolutely flabbergasted.
3	"Antiques Roadshow"	14 minutes	10.94 million (Note: Viewing figures for the whole of that night's Comic Relief.)	11 March 2005
When the Antiques Roadshow comes to Dibley, the villagers take along items to be valued. David is told that his "priceless" paintings are all worthless imitations, until he puts his fist through one in a fit of rage and is told he has just destroyed a valuable Manet. Jim thinks he is on Ready Steady Cook. However, when Alice goes to get her prized Papa Smurf model that her father gave her valued, Geraldine is forced to make the valuer, Hilary Kay, lie about its true worth. When Alice thinks she could sell it for its "value", Geraldine must sell her television and ring for Alice.
4	"Wife Swap"	9 minutes	9.73 million	16 March 2007
Geraldine participates in a wife-swapping reality television show and gets to live with Sting. While Harry spends the week with Trudie Styler, Geraldine thinks that Sting is flirting with her. When it turns out he is not, she shoves a cake in his face. Alice questions Sting's appearance in his band The Police, comparing him to her uncle who was in the police. Last appearance of Alice and Harry
5	"Women Bishops"	10 minutes	9.87 million	15 March 2013
Geraldine and the parishioners head to London to vote on allowing women to become bishops, but make the mistake of sending Jim to cast the vote. Meanwhile, Geraldine flirts with an attractive vicar (Damian Lewis) and Frank's failing hearing leads him to make some major slip ups. Last appearance of Owen, Frank and David.
6	"The Bishop of Dibley"	10 minutes	TBA	13 March 2015
After taking part in the Ice Bucket Challenge (which itself goes awry), Geraldine gets an offer to become Bishop. Confusion on her behalf, however, leaves her last in the running when other, more successful, candidates turn up for the interview process. Guest starring Richard Ayoade, Annette Crosbie, Maureen Lipman, Emma Watson, Ruth Jones, Jennifer Saunders and Fiona Bruce. The only regular characters to appear are Geraldine, Hugo and Jim. Last appearance of Jim
7	"The Big Night In"	4 minutes	TBA	23 April 2020
Following the lockdown caused by COVID-19, Geraldine gives a short service to her parishioners from her home. She describes her efforts to tidy up the mountain of Easter eggs, and issues corrections to the parish newsletter. The latest parish council meeting was also relayed, though attempts to use Zoom backfire as no one else has a computer, so Geraldine is left to make all the decisions herself. The short ends as Geraldine promises that the situation will be resolved. Joint collaboration between Comic Relief and Children in Need. The only character to appear (apart from flashbacks) is Geraldine.

For Comic Relief 2021, Dawn French appeared as Geraldine alongside real-life TV vicar Rev Kate Bottley lip-syncing to Juice by Lizzo.

=== The Vicar of Dibley in Lockdown (2020) ===
In December 2020, a series of shorter "lockdown" episodes of The Vicar of Dibley were broadcast. These were mainly monologues by Geraldine, in the form of COVID-19 lockdown video messages to her congregation, with occasional appearances by Hugo. In a change to pre-2020 episodes, the characters broke the fourth wall speaking directly to the viewer as if they were Dibley residents. These lockdown minis were made, set and shown during the pandemic when churches were closed for many months and congregations across the UK met virtually via methods such as Zoom.

No. overall	Title	Duration	Writer(s)	Airdate	Viewers (millions)
1	"Episode One"	9 minutes	Richard Curtis and Paul Mayhew-Archer	7 December 2020	4.81
In the first of her online sermons, the vicar has to explain the difference between miles and metres when it comes to social distancing. She finds that getting a lockdown haircut from someone more used to keeping animal coats trimmed "may not be the best way to look fabulous", and "dropping in to the online Sunday School" turns out to be more trouble than it is worth. She shares her sermon with Hugo Horton, who is finding it difficult whilst in lockdown listening to his father tell the same old anecdotes.
2	"Episode Two"	9 minutes	Richard Curtis and Paul Mayhew-Archer	14 December 2020	3.55
In her second set of sermons, Geraldine finally experiences the joy of going outside again. She also learns the dangers of trying to write sermons whilst also enjoying Advocaat, reveals the results of the village quiz, discusses the fiasco over school exams, ponders the Black Lives Matter movement and remembers her wonderful verger, Alice.
3	"Episode Three"	8 minutes	Richard Curtis and Paul Mayhew-Archer	21 December 2020	N/A
Dibley is holding a mask design competition, with awards being made to the brightest and best. But the vicar has to point out fairly early on that the masks are meant to be the sort that are worn to help prevent the spread of Covid-19 rather than the sort that are worn to scare people at Halloween.
4	"Compilation"	34 minutes	Richard Curtis and Paul Mayhew-Archer	23 December 2020	N/A
A compilation of all three of the lockdown episodes. The vicar muses upon lockdown, social distancing, masks and absent friends. The episode contains additional previously unseen material and scenes. This episode was dedicated to (in loving memory of) Liz Smith, John Bluthal, Emma Chambers and Roger Lloyd-Pack, who had all previously died.
