= Carol MacReady =

English actress

- Occupation: Actress
- Years active: 1961–present
- Spouses: James Laurenson (m. 1970; div. 1997)
- Children: 1

Carol MacReady is an English actress. She has been working in the profession since 1961. She is known for the role of Mrs Dribelle in the series Bodger and Badger.

== Career ==
=== Television ===
MacReady has often been cast as matronly, authority and mother figures, such as Mrs Atkins in Danger: Marmalade at Work, Madge in Victoria Wood's play The Library, Susan Speed in Waiting For God, Mrs Daws in The Darling Buds of May, Elizabeth in The Ghostbusters of East Finchley, Agnes Wilford in 102 Dalmatians (2000), Olga in My Family and Ethel in Doc Martin.

One of her earlier notable roles was in the Play for Today story Schmoedipus (1974) written by Dennis Potter. In 1996, MacReady was memorably cast as Mrs Tinker, the paranoid mother of Alice Tinker in The Vicar of Dibley episode "The Christmas Lunch Incident". She later appeared as Mrs Norcliffe in Gentleman Jack and Irene Hickson in two episodes of Strike.

=== Theatre ===
On stage, MacReady has appeared in several productions with the Royal Shakespeare Company, including Love in a Wood as Mrs Joiner, Bartholomlew Fair as Ursula and Roberto Zucco as Madam. She has also featured in several plays at the National Theatre, including The Mandate as Tamara and Tales From the Vienna Woods as First Aunt.

== Personal life ==
MacReady married actor James Laurenson in 1970. The marriage produced one child. The couple divorced in 1997.

== Selected filmography ==
=== Television ===
Year	Title	Role	Notes
1967	ITV Play of the Week	Sister Theresa	Little Moon of Alban
1968	Sherlock Holmes	Carrie	Episode: "Shoscombe's Old Place"
1968	Softly Softly	Ellen Simpson	Episode: "Take Them in Singles"
1970	The Six Wives of Henry VIII	Amalie	Episode: "Anne of Cleeves"
1971	The Mind of Mr. J.G. Reeder	Miss Hillard	Episode: "Death of an Angel"
1974	Play For Today	Dorothy	Schmoedipus
1974-5	An Unofficial Rose	Nancy Bowshott	4 episodes
1975	The Sweeney	Kath	Episode: "Trojan Bus"
1975-6	Couples	Heather Barnes	64 episodes
1978	Come Back, Lucy	Mrs Clayton	2 episodes
1980	Play For Today	ATS Sergeant	The Imitation Game
1981	The Flame Trees of Thika	Mrs Nimmo	4 episodes
1982	Tales of the Unexpected	Liz Ferguson	A Harmless Vanity
1982	The Woman in White	Mrs Michelson	3 episodes (mini series)
1982	Union Castle	Elizabeth Steel	5 episodes
1984	Danger: Marmalade at Work	Mrs Atkins	10 episodes
1984	Winter Sunlight	Mrs Swain	2 episodes
1985	Mapp and Lucia	Daisy Quantock	2 episodes
1985	Roll Over Beethoven	Petra Stopforth	1 episode
1985-6	Troubles and Strife	Margaret	13 episodes
1986	Dramarama	Marian Bert	Last Days at Black Berts
1987	A Dororthy L. Sayers Mystery	Miss Martin	3 episodes (mini series)
1989	Victoria Wood	Madge	Episode: "The Library"
1990	Agatha Christie's Poirot	Milly Croft	Episode: "Peril at End House"
1990	Birds of a Feather	Mrs Simmons	Episode: "Love on the Run"
1991	Never the Twain	Traffic Warden	Episode: "The First of the Queue"
1991	Waiting For God	Susan Speed	Episode: "Foreign Workers"
1992	A Bit of Fry and Laurie	Liz Tragic	1 episode
1992	Casualty	Aunt Pauline	Episode: "Body and Soul"
1992-3	The Darling Buds of May	Mrs Daws	4 episodes
1993	The Inspector Alleyn Mysteries	Mrs Ives	Episode; "Death at the Bar"
1993	Get Back	Pam	Episode: "Drive My Car"
1993	The Return of the Psammead	Cook	3 episodes
1994	The Rector's Wife	Celia Harper	3 episodes (mini series)
1995	The Ghostbusters of East Finchley	Elizabeth	5 episodes
1996	The Vicar of Dibley	Mrs Tinker	Episode: "The Christmas Lunch Incident"
1996-7	Bodger and Badger	Mrs Dribelle	33 episodes
1997	Dangerfield	Mrs Smedley	Episode: "Guilt"
2000	Trial and Retribution	Vera Collingwood	2 episodes
2004	Doc Martin	Mrs Beckett	Episode: "The Portwenn Effect"
2006	Midsomer Murders	Hatty Down	Episode: "Vixen's Run"
2008	Agatha Christie's Poirot	Miss Johnson	Episode: "Cat Among the Pigeons"
2009	My Family	Olga	Episode: "The Guru"
2013	Doc Martin	Ethel	2 episodes
2016	Casualty	Evelyn Thompson	Episode: "A Life Less Ordinary"
2017	Marley's Ghosts	Mrs Harrington	Episode: "Dead Man's Chest"
2018	The Royals	Dottie	Episode: "There's Daggers in Men's Smiles"
2020	Shakespeare & Hathaway: Private Investigators	Dorothy Tearsheet	Episode: "The Sticking Place"
2022	Gentleman Jack	Mrs Norcliffe	Episode: "Faith is All"
2022	Strike	Irene Hickson	2 episodes
2022	This is Going to Hurt	German Professor	1 episode

=== Film ===
Year	Title	Role	Notes
1971	Cider with Rosie	Baroness	TV film
1973	The Taming of the Shrew	Katherina	TV film
1977	A Christmas Carol	Mrs Cratchit	TV film
1978	Me! I'm Afraid of Virginia Woolf	Wendy	TV film
1980	Invasion	Czech official	TV film
1982	Murder is Easy	Mrs Pierce	TV film
1982	The Scarlet Pimpernel	Madame Duval	TV film
1983	Forever Young	Brenda	
1991	How's Business	Kath	
1994	A Feast at Midnight	Miss Plunder	
1994	Stanley's Dragon	Mrs Bradley	
2000	Quills	Sister Noirceuill	
2000	102 Dalmatians	Agnes Wilford	
2003	Wondrous Oblivion	Mrs Wilson	
2006	Love Lies Bleeding	Landlady	TV film
2018	Walk like a Panther	Pat	
2018	Dead in a Week or Your Money Back	Celia	
2021	A Boy Called Christmas	Mother Gerri	
2021	Decrypted	Alice Bertrand	
