= List of The Vicar of Dibley characters =

A list of characters in the BBC sitcom The Vicar of Dibley:

== Geraldine Granger ==
Geraldine Kennedy (née Granger) is a female vicar and the central character of the show. She is portrayed by Dawn French. The character made her debut in 1994 appearing in all of the episodes and has been reprised several times after the conclusion of the series in 2007 in various charity specials and the Christmas 2020 Lockdown mini revival during the COVID-19 pandemic. For Comic Relief 2021, Geraldine is visited by (real-life) celebrity vicar Rev Kate Bottley.

== David Horton ==
David Horton
- The Vicar of Dibley character
- Portrayed by: Gary Waldhorn
- Duration: 1994–2007, 2013
- First appearance: "The Arrival"
- Last appearance: Comic Relief 2013
In-universe information
- Occupation: Councillor
- Brothers: Simon Horton
- Wife: Unnamed (divorced)
- Sons: Hugo Horton
- Daughters: One (illegitimate)
- Grandsons: Four
- Granddaughters: Geraldine Horton; Five others

Councillor David Francis Matthew Horton MBE, MA (Cantab), FRCS, born on 3 September in an unknown year, is chairman of the parish council, gentleman farmer, pillar of the community and District Councillor for Dibley and Whitworth. He is the main opponent of the vicar, yet as the series progresses, he comes to respect her. A notorious bully, he controlled the parish council without any opposition until Geraldine's arrival, and is consequently disliked by many, being rigid, old-fashioned, efficient, callous and punctual, yet as the show progresses, becomes lovable and endearing. Apart from the vicar, he is the only sane person in the village. Despite regularly complaining about the council, he has never missed a meeting. In fact, in one episode Jim and Owen reminisce about when David's wife went into labour with Hugo, and David held the meeting in the maternity ward. His wife left him prior to the show's beginning due to his obnoxious nature (although he mistakenly believes she left him because he was a bad cook). In later episodes of the series, David comes to fall for the vicar and even proposes to her (she accepts his proposal but later decides to back out). He is a Conservative, though he joins the Labour Party in 2000 as part of his attempt to persuade Geraldine to marry him; by the 2004-05 episode "Happy New Year" he is a Conservative Party supporter again. After initial reluctance, he supported the Make Poverty History campaign in 2004-05. Hugo mentions that people used to call him "Dirty David" due to his collection of Victorian pornography. David was an unloving father to Hugo and even threatened to disinherit him if he married Alice, whom David detests. However, he changed his mind and later admitted to the vicar that he accepted Alice and Hugo are happy together. In December 2020 it was revealed that David had moved to Monaco that summer, where he had married a baroness, with 600 guests at the wedding.

Gary Waldhorn died in 2022.

== Alice Horton ==
Alice Horton
- The Vicar of Dibley character
- Portrayed by: Emma Chambers
- Duration: 1994–2007
- First appearance: "The Arrival"
- Last appearance: "Wife Swap"; (Comic Relief 2007)
In-universe information
- Occupation: Verger, teaching assistant
- Mother: Mrs Tinker
- Sisters: Mary Tinker
- Husband: Hugo Horton (1998–2017)
- Sons: At least four
- Daughters: Geraldine Horton; Five others
- Other relatives: Reg Dwight

Alice Springs Horton (née Tinker) is the verger at the church. Blonde and scatter-brained (Geraldine describes her as having "the intellectual capacity and charisma of a cactus"), Alice is the only main character who does not sit on the parish council, although she did sit in for the vicar on one occasion (in the TV special "Autumn"). The product of a one-night stand, she often states that her father is dead or claims not to know who her father really was. In one episode she tells Geraldine her biological father was David Horton; after some confusion, she clarifies that she meant a cousin of councillor David Horton's father (present-day David Horton's first cousin once removed and predecessor on the parish council, who was known as a local philanderer), also called David Horton. Alice has a younger sister, Mary, who is even more dim-witted. Alice's mother is often described as "mad" by Geraldine, and in the last two episodes is said to be in a psychiatric home.

Alice and Hugo, her second cousin once removed, are fond of each other, and the vicar plays Cupid successfully in one episode. They eventually marry and have ten children - the eldest, Geraldine, was born on 24 December 1999 in the middle of the village nativity play in which her parents were playing Mary and Joseph. Featuring in the closing credits for most episodes, Geraldine and Alice have a cup of tea while Geraldine tries to tell Alice a joke (frequently the joke is slightly off-colour). Alice rarely understands the jokes that Geraldine tells her and usually proceeds to over-analyse the humour, thereby completely killing the joke. In the final episode Geraldine's new husband Harry Kennedy explains the grammar involved and Alice finally understands it. Alice believes in the Easter Bunny, Father Christmas and the tooth fairy. As a child Alice had a series of budgies named Carrot and, until Geraldine reveals that each Carrot was a separate budgie entirely, Alice believed that her first budgie Carrot was reincarnated, "just like Jesus, but with feathers". After reading The Da Vinci Code she believes herself to be descended from Jesus. She is dim-witted and naïve, but also sweet-natured and very endearing. She has many misconceptions, such as mistaking Black Sabbath for gospel singers, telling David that "Jesus was one of The Carpenters" and referring to Albert Einstein as "Andrew Einstein".

Alice is a fan of the Wombles (which she believes to be living creatures rather than people in costumes) and of the Teletubbies. In episode 12, broadcast on 22 January 1998, when Alice married Hugo Horton, her bridesmaids were dressed as Laa-Laa and Po, and her bridal headband lit up. A rabid fan of Doctor Who, she also unsuccessfully tried to incorporate themes from the sci-fi show into her wedding, including having a wedding gown "with lots of hearts on it...and a different Doctor Who in each one." However, she ended up with a gown decorated with a massive heart with hers and Hugo's names inside. She succeeds in having a Doctor Who wedding during Geraldine's own wedding. When Geraldine's friends take over wedding preparations, Alice uses her position as maid of honour to dress herself as the Tenth Doctor and the other bridesmaids as Daleks.

Actress Emma Chambers died in 2018. In the 2020 Lockdown Specials, the character was written out of the programme when it was revealed that Alice had died of cancer three years prior to the events of the specials.

== Hugo Horton ==
Hugo Horton
- The Vicar of Dibley character
- Portrayed by: James Fleet
- Duration: 1994–2007, 2013, 2015, 2020
- First appearance: "The Arrival"
- Last appearance: Lockdown, compilation episode
In-universe information
- Occupation: Council member, David Horton's campaign manager
- Father: David Horton
- Mother: Unnamed
- Sisters: One (illegitimate)
- Wife: Alice Tinker (1998–2017; her death)
- Sons: Four
- Daughters: Geraldine Horton; Five others
- Uncles: Simon Horton

Hugo Horton is David's sweet-natured, friendly yet dim-witted and childlike son; Geraldine once also likens his intellect to a cactus. In "Celebrity Vicar", a newspaper describes him in the headline "Rich as Croesus, Thick as Shit"; Hugo does not think the press meant to be rude, to which David replies "Though you can't deny it's a possibility." Sometimes seen sporting a Royal Agricultural College tie, he served as his father's campaign manager at the October 1994 district council election but inadvertently wound up going door to door with David's Labour opponent, Kevin Smewyn, delivering leaflets and making introductions for him. As revealed in the first episode, Hugo holds no O Level qualifications. Hugo and Alice Tinker are always shown to have tender feelings for each other, but they do not get together as a couple until Geraldine plays Cupid in "Engagement". David was never a loving nor affectionate father to Hugo, dominating him and undermining all his dreams and ambitions. In one episode, Geraldine mentions that God is a father much like his own father, and Hugo recalls what his father did to him as a child: shouting, insulting and caning him (although he does mention a time when David pretended to be Father Christmas). When Geraldine corrects him and says she was referring to a loving, caring father, Hugo believed he had another father. Despite this, Hugo still loves and respects his father but finally stands up to him when it came to marrying Alice, whom David predictably despises. He nicknames Geraldine "Mrs God". Hugo has a Golden Retriever named Bruno who is seen in "Animals" and "Election". He is a huge fan of Kylie Minogue. He is the only character other than Geraldine to have appeared in the lockdown specials.

== Frank Pickle ==
Frank Pickle
- The Vicar of Dibley character
- Portrayed by: John Bluthal
- Duration: 1994–2007, 2013
- First appearance: "The Arrival"
- Last appearance: Comic Relief Sketch 2013
In-universe information
- Occupation: Parish council clerk
- Sisters: Two (unnamed)
- Children: 1 (possibly; illegitimate)
- Other relatives: Wilfred (second cousin)

Frank Pickle (born 1934, though also claimed to be 12 August 1929) is the likable but boring and pedantic clerk of the parish council. He is so boring that nobody listens to him, even when he tries to relate such momentous events such as "the time he went down to the pub and they'd completely run out of crisps" or "the time when the milkman was 47 minutes late" or "when he heard a cuckoo in March, only it turned out to be a pigeon". In "Celebrity Vicar", while trying to get "crazy anecdotes" about Geraldine for a journalist with all the details, the newspaper headline asks, "Is this The Most Boring Man in Britain?" Due to his tendency to go on and on when given the opportunity, it is said that five people, including his parents, have died while he was talking, and even his therapist accused him of being boring. He decided to declare his homosexuality in a radio broadcast to the village (after over 40 years of keeping it secret), but apart from Geraldine, who was with Frank at the time, none of the other villagers listened to his broadcast. The next day, he decides to assert his sexuality more openly by wearing a bright cerise blazer to attend the parish council meeting rather than his usual brown one. Other references in the show suggest that Frank is bisexual, as he once admitted to fancying Margaret Beckett, as well as fellow councillors Owen Newitt and David Horton; is as affected by the naked model in the Dibley Parish Life Art Class as the others and painted the same model in the landscape class. He also admitted to sleeping with Owen's cousin Sally and it is implied that he fathered one of her three children (the other two being fathered by Jim and Owen). He defines his ideal man as a "25-year-old South American with an interest in Oxfordshire council procedures".

He gives Alice away at her wedding, but wears a sign which states that he is not Alice's father, and also tries to put a note in the programme that states that he is not Alice's father but is a close family friend and has "not had sexual relations with Mrs Tinker in any way whatsoever"."

John Bluthal died in 2018. As of December 2020, the character had yet to be written out of the show: though unseen, he is mentioned as being present.

== Jim Trott ==
Jim Trott
- The Vicar of Dibley character
- Portrayed by: Trevor Peacock
- Duration: 1994–2007, 2013, 2015
- First appearance: "The Arrival"
- Last appearance: Comic Relief Sketch 2015
In-universe information
- Occupation: Council member, Farmer
- Spouse: Doris Trott (1955–??)
- Children: Unspecified

Jim Trott is a parish council member, who became the church organist after the death of Letitia Cropley. Jim has an idiosyncratic speech impediment, prefacing "No-no-no-no-no..." to almost everything he says, in particular "yes!" A newspaper in "Celebrity Vicar" gives him the headline "No, No, No, No Brain". His stuttering once led him to lose on Deal or No Deal. His wife Doris does the opposite, saying "yes-yes-yes-yes-yes...". Jim used to be a good dancer, though an unconvincing singer. He harbours misconceptions about numerous celebrity figures; once believing Bruce Forsyth to be "immortal", and Noel Edmonds to have invented Christmas. Despite being married to Doris, he has no qualms about joining Owen in openly flirting with the vicar, frequently commenting on her "lovely arse". He is also openly promiscuous with a penchant for young blondes and Eastern beauties. In one episode he learns that Doris is having sex with her cousin Brenda. In the episode "The Christmas Lunch Incident", Jim mentions that Doris is taking a "competent grandparenting" course, suggesting Jim has children, but this is never specified in the show. However, it is implied he fathered a child with Owen's cousin Sally. In the final episode, Jim proposes to Geraldine, who responds with a horrified "No-no-no-no-no...".

Ill health prevented Trevor Peacock from appearing in the 2020 special. His absence was explained by having Jim misunderstand the "keeping 2 m apart order" as miles instead of metres; therefore he was said to be hiding in the forest outside Dibley.

Peacock died in 2021.

== Owen Newitt ==
Owen Newitt
- The Vicar of Dibley character
- Portrayed by: Roger Lloyd-Pack
- Duration: 1994–2007, 2013
- First appearance: "The Arrival"
- Last appearance: Comic Relief Sketch 2013
In-universe information
- Occupation: Council member, Farmer
- Children: One (possibly; illegitimate)
- First cousins: Sally

Owen Newitt is a local farmer and a parish council member with a very earthy manner. He lives alone at the farm with his animals and is famous for displaying extremely poor personal hygiene, compounded with chronic problems with his stomach and bowels, both resulting in flatulence. The newspaper in "Celebrity Vicar" dubbed him "Britain's B.O. King". He was the first to support the new vicar's appointment as a lone dissenter, saying that a female vicar would not be a bad thing since the previous vicar was "a regular old woman anyway", just as David looked set to persuade the other members of the parish council to oppose Geraldine's appointment. His signature running gag was that he was frequently late for the parish council meetings, and had legitimate, if gruesome, reasons for his delays (often involving graphic tales of amputating animals' appendages or otherwise mangling them). Previous generations of his family also appear to be as bloodthirsty as Owen, as he proudly declares they have been "staging cockfights" and "gassing badgers" in the village for several centuries, and he also has a few murderers in his family. He also has had a history of "sorrow and tragedy", according to Jim and Frank: his brother drowned himself because of his girlfriend's refusing to marry him; his father shot himself shortly after his wife left him; and his grandmother tried to leave, but his grandfather shot her and then himself. Owen proposed to the vicar in "Engagement". She rejected him, mainly because she simply did not love him (she also cited, not to his face, that "his breath smells like nerve gas" and the hair gel he used was actually lard). He was not upset, having found out that she was a drinker and declaring he cannot tolerate women who drink. Despite this, he frequently makes crude and misguided attempts at flirting with her, which typically backfire, and even proposed to her again the night before her wedding to Harry Kennedy. Regardless of his foul mouth and coarse nature, Owen is a genuinely kind-hearted and caring person, a fact noted by the vicar, Hugo and Alice, both of whom appointed him godfather to their firstborn daughter. Owen spent every Christmas alone since his uncle's death in 1971 until Geraldine joined him for Christmas dinner in 1996 (one of many such invitations she accepted that year). In several episodes, dialogue suggests that Owen engages in bestiality (such as when he declares rumours that the vicar is a lesbian to be the "best news since they made having sex with animals legal again"). Owen also has a swearing "probling" and often uses the word "bloody", describing the word as "a useful adjective".

As of December 2020, the character continues to be mentioned and had yet to be written out of the show despite Roger Lloyd-Pack's death in 2014.

== Letitia Cropley ==
Letitia Cropley
- The Vicar of Dibley character
- Portrayed by: Liz Smith
- Duration: 1994–96
- First appearance: "The Arrival"
- Last appearance: "The Easter Bunny"
In-universe information
- Occupation: Council member, church warden, retired librarian
- Sisters: 1 (unknown name)

Letitia Cropley was a parish council member, arranger of the church flowers and the Dibley church organist. Geraldine once referred to her as "The Queen of Cordon Bleurgh", and David Horton called her "The Dibley Poisoner". She was the creator of such revolting "delicacies" as "bread and butter pudding surprise" (a recipe for which she was breeding snails), a Marmite cake which she served for Frank's birthday, orange cake with Branston Pickle icing (which she served at the cake stall at the Dibley autumn fayre), parsnip brownies, plain pancakes "with just a hint of liver," and chocolate spread sandwiches made with taramasalata. Letitia only appeared in the first series and the special "The Easter Bunny", in which she died. Her dying request to Geraldine was that she take over from her as the Easter Bunny, taking chocolate eggs around the village each Easter. However, when Geraldine saw every member of the parish council doing the same, as well as some other residents, it became clear that she had made the same request to all of them. Earlier in the episode she described herself as having a "memory like an elephant that's lost its memory".

After her death, Jim and Frank described her as a "redheaded beauty in her youth", along with Owen's father having talked of her often, with various nicknames such as 'Luscious Letitia,' Titillatin' Tish,' 'Cropley the Cracker' and 'Always lets you dock your boat in her jetty Letty'. In her youth, she was notoriously promiscuous, with Jim and David both describing her as "rampant" and a "nymphomaniac." It has also been suggested that she has a crush on Frank and thinks he has "nice thighs", as she admitted on her death bed. She was generally seen on the parish council crocheting.

== Occasional characters ==
=== Simon Horton ===
Simon Horton
- The Vicar of Dibley character
- Portrayed by: Clive Mantle
- Duration: 1998-99
- First appearance: "Love & Marriage"
- Last appearance: "Autumn"
In-universe information
- Occupation: Accountant
- Brothers: David Horton
- Wife: Unnamed (died 1992)
- Nephews: Hugo Horton
- Other relatives: Geraldine Horton (great niece); 5 other great nieces; 4 great nephews

David Horton's very tall and attractive brother Simon Horton (Clive Mantle) becomes one of Geraldine's lovers in a brief romance. They first meet at the drinks party before Alice and Hugo's wedding and later they meet again when Simon comes up for Sunday lunch with David. After many efforts to get rid of several parishioners who come knocking on her door with various requests, including telling Jim Trott and Frank Pickle that a crossword solution is "Plodipop", and arranging the four words "Leave-You-Remorseless-Bastards" on the Scrabble board, Geraldine finally manages to join Simon, who is waiting patiently in her bedroom, followed by a few weeks of romantic bliss. Later Simon dumps her telling her that he has a girlfriend back in Liverpool. A heartbroken Geraldine therefore goes into seclusion, binging on chocolate bars and pots of ice cream, and neglecting her church duties. She decides to resign from her ministry but changes her mind when her parishioners and friends show their loyalty and support by hanging up a huge banner that reads "That tall git Simon may have bonked you and then dumped you like an old jock strap - but we still love you."

=== Tristan Campbell ===
Tristan/Tristram Campbell
- The Vicar of Dibley character
- Portrayed by: Peter Capaldi
- Duration: 1994-96
- First appearance: "Songs of Praise"
- Last appearance: "The Christmas Lunch Incident"
In-universe information
- Occupation: Television producer
- Spouse: Aoife

Tristan Campbell (although in his second and final appearance his name inexplicably became "Tristram") is the producer of the show Songs of Praise, which came to film in Dibley's St Barnabus' Church in the second episode of the first series. Upon first meeting him Geraldine fell head over heels for him, and believed he felt the same way. David, on the other hand, developed feelings for Ruth, the Songs of Praise camera operator. However, both David and Geraldine were heartbroken to later discover that Tristan and Ruth were in fact a couple.

In his second and last appearance, Tristan paid a surprise visit to Geraldine on Christmas Day, asking her to marry him. She assumed he was proposing, and joyfully accepted. However, this turned out to be a misunderstanding, as he then introduced her to Aoife (Orla Brady), his fiancée, and Geraldine was devastated to discover he was asking her to perform his and Aoife's wedding ceremony, not be his bride.

=== Harry Kennedy ===
Harry Kennedy
- The Vicar of Dibley character
- Portrayed by: Richard Armitage
- Duration: 2006-2007
- First appearance: "The Handsome Stranger"
- Last appearance: Comic Relief Sketch 2007
In-universe information
- Occupation: Accountant
- Sisters: Rosie Kennedy
- Wife: Geraldine Granger (2007)

Harry Jasper Kennedy moves to Dibley from London, buying Sleepy Cottage from David Horton for £500,000. His first visitors in Dibley are Geraldine and Alice, who initially intend to make it clear to Harry that he is not welcome in the village, but are won over by his good looks and friendly manner the moment he opens his front door. Over the course of the following days, Harry and Geraldine go on a succession of dates together, which culminate in the two sharing a kiss. Their romance takes a brief knock when Harry's sister Rosie (Keeley Hawes) visits him in Dibley and Geraldine mistakes her for Harry's romantic partner. However, Harry proposes to Geraldine, who ecstatically agrees to marry him. Their wedding is the focal point of the final regular episode of the series, The Vicar in White. Harry briefly appears once more in the 2007 special sketch for Comic Relief, in which he and Geraldine participate in Celebrity, Non-Entity Wife Swap, in which Sting moves in with Geraldine for a week, while Harry spends a week with Trudie Styler. He does not appear in the Lockdown specials, but is mentioned by Hugo, when he reveals that Geraldine and Harry went on a "pilgrimage" to Cadbury World.

=== Doris Trott ===
Doris Trott
- The Vicar of Dibley character
- Portrayed by: Patricia Kane
- Duration: 1994
- First appearance: "Songs of Praise"
- Last appearance: "Election"
In-universe information
- Husband: Jim Trott

Doris Trott (Patricia Kane) is married to Jim Trott. She appears in three episodes of the first series. She shares Jim's dithery nature, but rather than repeating the word "no" before saying what she wants to say, she repeats the word "yes". It is mentioned in the episode "The Christmas Lunch Incident" that her absence is due to her being away on a "competent grandparenting course" which also suggests the Trotts have children. In the episode "Autumn", Jim mentions that Doris had been having sex with her cousin Brenda.

=== Geraldine Horton ===
Geraldine Horton is the eldest daughter of Alice and Hugo Horton. She was born on Christmas Eve 1999 during the village's nativity play, when Alice and Hugo played Mary and Joseph. Her grandfather, David Horton, pities Geraldine and her siblings for being born to their simple-minded parents, yet it is evident that they adore their daughter. A statue of Geraldine as an infant stands on the village green. In the Lockdown specials it is mentioned that she is studying at Oxford University.
