= Trevor Peacock =

English actor (1931–2021)

- Peacock as Jim Trott (2006)
- Born: Trevor Edward Peacock; 19 May 1931; Tottenham, London, England
- Died: 8 March 2021 (aged 89); Yeovil, Somerset, England
- Occupations: Actor, songwriter
- Spouses: Iris Jones (m. 1957, divorced); Tilly Tremayne (m. 1979)
- Children: 4, including Daniel and Harry

Trevor Edward Peacock (19 May 1931 – 8 March 2021) was an English actor and songwriter. He made his name as a theatre actor, including for his roles in Shakespeare, working at the Royal Shakespeare Company, the National Theatre and Royal Exchange Manchester. He later became known for playing Jim Trott in the BBC comedy series The Vicar of Dibley.

Among his songs, "Mrs. Brown, You've Got a Lovely Daughter" was a US number one hit for Herman's Hermits in 1965.

== Early life ==
Trevor Edward Peacock was born on 19 May 1931 in Tottenham, London, the son of Victor and Alexandra (née Matthews) Peacock. His father was a Baptist lay preacher. Peacock was educated at Enfield Grammar School.

Peacock was interested in performing from childhood, participating in plays at school and seeing films; he had to sneak into the cinema because his parents forbade him from seeing films. Prior to his acting career, he was a teacher for a few years in north London, including spells at Cuckoo Hall School in Edmonton and Carterhatch Junior School in Enfield.

== Film and television career ==
Peacock's many television roles include Jim Trott in The Vicar of Dibley, Rouault in Madame Bovary (opposite Keith Barron), Quilp in The Old Curiosity Shop and Old Bailey in Neverwhere. He appeared in a wide variety of programmes, such as EastEnders (playing Sid, a war veteran Alfie Moon met in France), LWT's Wish Me Luck (in which he played resistance leader Renard), Jonathan Creek, Between the Lines, The Riff Raff Element, The Thin Blue Line, My Family, and in a 1990 episode of Van der Valk.

Peacock also wrote several films, including He Who Rides a Tiger starring Tom Bell and Judi Dench in her debut role.

Peacock had starring roles in several plays in the BBC Television Shakespeare series, including the title role in Titus Andronicus, Feste in Twelfth Night, Lord Talbot in Henry VI, Part 1 and Jack Cade in Henry VI, Part 2. He was the Gravedigger in Franco Zeffirelli's 1990 film version of Hamlet, Old Joe in the 1999 Patrick Stewart version of A Christmas Carol, and the Innkeeper in the 2000 made-for-television film version of Don Quixote. In 1962, he played Willy, in The Barber of Stamford Hill. In 1964, he appeared with The Beatles in the television special Around the Beatles, playing Peter Quince in the Pyramus and Thisbe scene (Act V, Scene 1) from William Shakespeare's A Midsummer Night's Dream.

He played the father of Father Christmas in the 2007 film Fred Claus, co-starring Vince Vaughn and Paul Giamatti. In July 2009, he also had a bit part in the TV drama Hotel Babylon. Peacock appeared as "Captain Zero" in the BBC TV series Last of The Summer Wine (1990) and as Maurey in The Sins (2000). In 2012, he played George in Quartet, a British comedy-drama film based on the play of the same title.

He starred in the 1991 fantasy BBC radio play Heart of Hark'un. In 2002 he filmed an episode of Dinotopia in Budapest, playing the mysterious sage Lok in "Night of the Wartosa". In 2010, he appeared in The Old Guys and a radio adaptation of I, Claudius.

== Songwriting ==
As a songwriter he wrote the 1960s pop hit "Mrs. Brown, You've Got a Lovely Daughter", which, recorded by Herman's Hermits, was number one on the US Billboard Hot 100 in May 1965, having been number one in Canada the month before. Other hit songs to his credit include "Mystery Girl" (recorded by Jess Conrad), "Made You" (Adam Faith), "Gossip Calypso" (Bernard Cribbins), "Stick Around" (Billy Fury), "That's What Love Will Do" and "Nature's Time For Love" (both recorded by Joe Brown).

Peacock wrote the lyrics for several hit singles by The Vernons Girls. The songs he wrote for the group include "Be Nice To Him Mama", "You Know What I Mean", "Funny All Over" and "He'll Never Come Back". He contributed the lyrics for the musical show Passion Flower Hotel (music by John Barry), and for a musical based on the newspaper cartoon strip Andy Capp (music by Alan Price). Before his acting career took off, Peacock compered Drumbeat for the BBC, also writing scripts for Oh Boy! and Six-Five Special.

== Theatre career ==
Peacock acted in the theatre throughout his career and was particularly associated with the Royal Exchange, Manchester. In addition to performing in many productions since the theatre opened in 1976, he also wrote a number of shows for the company. These include:

- Leaping Ginger. World premiere directed by Braham Murray with Christopher Neil (1977)
- Cinderella. World Premiere directed by Anthony Bowles and Michele Hardy with Wendy Morgan and Gabrielle Drake (1979)
- Andy Capp written with Alan Price. World premiere directed by Braham Murray (1982)
- Class K with Judy Loe, Colin Prockter and Rosalind Knight (1985)
- Jack and the Giant (world premiere directed by Mervyn Willis with Jason Watkins, 1986)

In the 1970s he became a member of the Royal Shakespeare Company, playing comic roles such as Silence and Feste, as well as more serious parts. During the 1990s he appeared in several National Theatre productions ranging from Jonson and Shakespeare to Pinter and Loesser.

=== Acting credits ===
Peacock's acting credits include:

- Estragon, Waiting for Godot by Samuel Beckett for the Century Theatre, Manchester directed by Michael Elliott (1967)
- Tony Lumpkin, She Stoops to Conquer by Oliver Goldsmith for the Century Theatre, Manchester directed by Braham Murray and then at the Garrick Theatre, London (1969)
- Titus Andronicus at the Round House, London (1971)
- Clov, Endgame by Samuel Beckett for the Century Theatre, Manchester directed by Braham Murray and then at the Shaw Theatre, London (1973)
- Sidney Prime, Sherlock Holmes for the Royal Shakespeare Company at the Aldwych Theatre, London, then (Broadway debut) Broadhurst Theatre (1974)
- Friar Mauro Tenda and Diego Lopez Duro, The Bewitched at the Aldwych Theatre, London (1975)
- Bishop of Ely and Fluellen, Henry V for the Royal Shakespeare Company, Memorial Theatre, Stratford-on-Avon, England, 1975, then at the Aldwych Theatre, London (1976)
- Poins, Henry IV, Parts I and II, for the Royal Shakespeare Company, Memorial Theatre, 1975, then at the Aldwych Theatre (1976)
- Sir Hugh Evans, The Merry Wives of Windsor, for the Royal Shakespeare Company, Memorial Theatre, 1975, then at the Aldwych Theatre (1976)
- Acres, The Rivals by Sheridan at the Royal Exchange, Manchester directed by Braham Murray (1976)
- Colonel Kottwitz, The Prince of Homburg by Heinrich von Kleist at the Royal Exchange, Manchester directed by Casper Wrede (1976)
- Zachariah Manning, Zack by Harold Brighouse at the Royal Exchange, Manchester directed by Eric Thompson (1976)
- Sergeant Match, What the Butler Saw by Joe Orton at the Royal Exchange, Manchester directed by Braham Murray (1977)
- Tom Price, A Family by Ronald Harwood. World premiere directed by Casper Wrede at the Royal Exchange, Manchester (1978)
- Aramis, The Three Musketeers by Braham Murray and Derek Griffiths. World premiere directed by Braham Murray at the Royal Exchange, Manchester (1979)
- Estragon, Waiting for Godot at the Royal Exchange, Manchester directed by Braham Murray and then at the Round House, London (1980)
- Elwood P Dowd, Harvey by Mary Chase at the Royal Exchange, Manchester directed by Eric Thompson (1981)
- Willy Loman, Death of a Salesman by Arthur Miller at the Royal Exchange, Manchester directed by Greg Hersov (1985)
- The Bluebird of Unhappiness, a Woody Allen review at the Royal Exchange, Manchester directed by Braham Murray (1987)
- Cap'n Andy Hawks in Show Boat for Opera North at the Grand Theatre, Leeds, premiere on 8 December 1989.
- Henry Horatio Hobson, Hobson's Choice by Harold Brighouse at the Royal Exchange, Manchester directed by Braham Murray (2003)
- Giles Cory, The Crucible by Arthur Miller directed by Dominic Cooke at the Royal Shakespeare Theatre, Stratford-upon-Avon (2006)

== Personal life and death ==
Peacock was married twice. His first marriage was to Iris Jones in 1957, which ended in divorce. His second wife was actress Tilly Tremayne, whom he married in 1979. Peacock had two sons, actors Daniel Peacock and Harry Peacock, and two daughters, Sally and Maudie. His daughter-in-law was actress Katherine Parkinson, who is married to Harry. Peacock lived in the village of East Coker, Somerset and was a supporter of Yeovil Town.

Peacock was diagnosed with Alzheimer's disease in 2009. It was reported in 2018 that he was in the advanced stages of the disease, had retired from acting and was living in a nursing home in Yeovil, Somerset. His last role was in the 2015 Vicar of Dibley Comic Relief Special. He died on 8 March 2021, aged 89.

=== Tributes ===
In 2025, Peacock appeared on a British postage stamp issued as part of a special set by Royal Mail, which commemorated the series The Vicar of Dibley.
