= Invisible Friends =

1989 children's play by Alan Ayckbourn

- Original language: English
- Written by: Alan Ayckbourn
- Characters: Lucy; Joy; Walt; Gary; Zara; Felix; Chuck
- Subject: Imaginary friends

Premiere
- Date: 23 November 1989
- Place: Stephen Joseph Theatre (Westwood site), Scarborough
- Official website

Invisible Friends is a 1989 children's play by the British playwright Alan Ayckbourn. It was written as a starring vehicle for actress Emma Chambers who portrayed the central character of teenager Lucy Baines in the original production at the Stephen Joseph Theatre in Scarborough, North Yorkshire, England for its run in late 1989 and early 1990. In Ayckbourn's wider ouvre of plays, Invisible Friends can be seen as having similarities to The Boy who Fell into a Book (1998) (which also deals with childhood dreams and nightmares), and in theme, the plays for adults Woman in Mind (1989) and Wildest Dreams (1991). Both works where an imagined fantasy goes too far for the characters. Invisible Friends is most often seen as a companion play to specifically Woman in Mind.

In both cases, they show the dangers of living your fantasy life at the expense of your real life and how you can get into some sort of trouble by confusing the two. In Lucy's tale, it became a moral fable about trying to love the people you live with, rather than the people you invent.

Ayckbourn said of writing Invisible Friends:

There is a joke, which I think I may have started, that I'm rewriting all my adult plays for kids. This is gentler (...) I'm also trying to retain as much as possible the colours that I put into the adult plays. (...) I would like them to laugh, of course, and to be excited, and to be afraid, but not so they can't sleep. My ulterior motive is to excite the children into coming back when they're 25, so we haven't got another lost generation saying: 'the theatre is something I don't understand.'"

== Summary ==
Lucy Baines, "an ordinary teenager", escapes her unhappiness with her family, joyless mother Joy, TV obsessed Walt, and the barely interactive Gary, by reviving her imaginary childhood friend, Zara. Lucy's family, however, do not approve of this imaginative thinking. After a thunderstorm, Zara suddenly appears to Lucy, and after Lucy snaps at her family, Zara helps Lucy to make Gary, Joy and Walt invisible. In a nightmarish act 2, Lucy stumbles into an alternate universe where she lives with the now visible Zara and Zara's "family". For a while, Lucy feels much happier with the "new" family and is delighted she no longer has to endure Joy, Walt, or Gary. However, the family of father Felix and brother Chuck are bizarre and eerie. Like Zara they seem to hold telekinetic powers that allow them to arrange objects. Zara also outstays her welcome and soon manipulates Lucy into catering and cleaning for Chuck and Felix and herself. The family turn on Lucy after an argument and kick her out. In an effort to reclaim what was once hers, Lucy attempts to enter the house again but is caught and a confrontation ensues. In the end Lucy manages to defeat Zara, Chuck, and Felix and make her family visible again, and they begin to pay more attention to her.

The entire second act of the play can be interpreted as a dream or nightmare that Lucy has, which the stage directions support, or a production can choose to make Zara and the invisible family's appearance and disappearance more ambiguous or psychologically more troubling.
