= Can You Keep a Secret? (TV series) =

British comedy television series

- Genre: Sitcom
- Created by: Simon Mayhew-Archer
- Written by: Simon Mayhew-Archer
- Directed by: Simon Hynd
- Starring: Dawn French; Mark Heap; Craig Roberts; Mandip Gill
- Music by: Oli Julian
- Country of origin: United Kingdom
- Original language: English
- No. of series: 1
- No. of episodes: 6

Production
- Executive producers: Kenton Allen; Dawn French; Simon Mayhew-Archer; Toby Welch
- Producers: Lauriel Martin; Joe Scantlebury
- Production companies: CBS Studios; Mayhay Studios; Big Talk Productions

Original release
- Network: BBC One
- Release: 7 January 2026 – present

Can You Keep a Secret? is a British television sitcom created and written by Simon Mayhew-Archer and starring Dawn French and Mark Heap. The series premiered on 7 January 2026 on BBC One. In February 2026, it was renewed for a second series.

== Premise ==
A retired couple, Debbie and William Fendon, living in the West Country of England are presented with a unique criminal opportunity to claim life insurance when William is mistakenly declared to have died. Their son Harry is caught up in the drama, trying to hide the secret from his wife Neha, who is a local police officer. The story revolves around the Fendons' attempts to figure out and stop whoever is blackmailing them for the money whilst hiding William, who has Parkinson’s Disease, from the public.

The premise is loosely based on the real-life John Darwin disappearance case.

== Cast and characters ==
=== Main ===
- Dawn French as Debbie Fendon
- Mark Heap as William Fendon
- Craig Roberts as Harry Fendon
- Mandip Gill as PC Neha Fendon

=== Recurring ===
- Sam Battersea as PC Susan Hinkman
- Gregory Gudgeon as Pigfish
- Geraldine McNulty as Pamela Anderson
- Heather Seymour as Jean Cotterill
- Shola Adewusi as Billie Codrington
- Adam Drake as Marcus Marsden
- Shivani Thussu as the Pharmacist
- Mona Goodwin as Dr Samira Harper
- Paul Chahidi as Clive Trunge
- Ian Barritt as Geoff Varley

== Episodes ==
No.	Title	Directed by	Written by	Original release date	UK viewers (millions)
1	"Episode 1"	Simon Hynd	Simon Mayhew-Archer	7 January 2026	3.65
Debbie drops a bombshell when she reveals that Harry’s father William is not actually dead, but has been secretly hiding in the attic. Harry is faced with a moral dilemma, join the conspiracy or expose the truth.
2	"Episode 2"	Simon Hynd	Simon Mayhew-Archer	14 January 2026	2.96
Debbie instructs Harry to keep their secret from Neha. However, the scheme faces complications when someone learns about William's existence and demands a share of the insurance money.
3	"Episode 3"	Simon Hynd	Simon Mayhew-Archer	21 January 2026	3.07
Tensions rise as Debbie and Neha clash over whether to return the insurance money, leaving William and Harry caught in the middle. Meanwhile, the threat of a blackmailer still looms, putting the entire scheme at risk.
4	"Episode 4"	Simon Hynd	Simon Mayhew-Archer	28 January 2026	2.91
While Neha and Debbie hunt the blackmailer, Harry and William juggle childcare. But with secrets at stake, Neha may have to fight dirty to protect the truth.
5	"Episode 5"	Simon Hynd	Simon Mayhew-Archer	4 February 2026	N/A
William has run out of medication forcing him and Neha to visit a drug dealer for help. Meanwhile, Debbie hatches a plan to protect the family just as new threats begin to close in.
6	"Episode 6"	Simon Hynd	Simon Mayhew-Archer	11 February 2026	N/A
The blackmailer places William and Harry in danger as Debbie considers handing herself in for her crimes.

== Production ==
The six-part series is created by Simon Mayhew-Archer and directed by Simon Hynd. The series is produced by CBS Studios, Mayhay Studios, and Big Talk Productions. Executive producers are Kenton Allen and Mayhew-Archer and the producers are Lauriel Martin and Joe Scantlebury. Toby Welch joined the project as an executive producer in January 2025.

Mark Heap and Dawn French were announced to be leading the cast in August 2024. The cast also includes Craig Roberts and Mandip Gill.

Filming began in the West Country in March 2025. Filming locations included Axbridge, Winscombe and Cheddar, Somerset.

On 18 February 2026, the BBC renewed the show for a second series. Production crews returned to film in Axbridge in late summer 2026.

== Broadcast ==
The series premiered on 7 January 2026 on BBC One, with all episodes made available on BBC iPlayer the same day. In the United States, the series premiered on 12 February 2026 on Paramount+.

== Reviews ==
The Guardian gave the series 3 out of 5 stars, with Lucy Mangan saying it has "charm, wit and warmth enough to work as soothing balm rather than riotously fun fare", while the Daily Telegraph said it was French's best work since The Vicar of Dibley. The Irish Times also gave a positive review, particularly pointing out French and Heap's characters.
