= St Mary the Virgin Church, Turville =

Coordinates: 51.614031°N 0.893693°W

St Mary's Church
- The Church of Saint Mary the Virgin
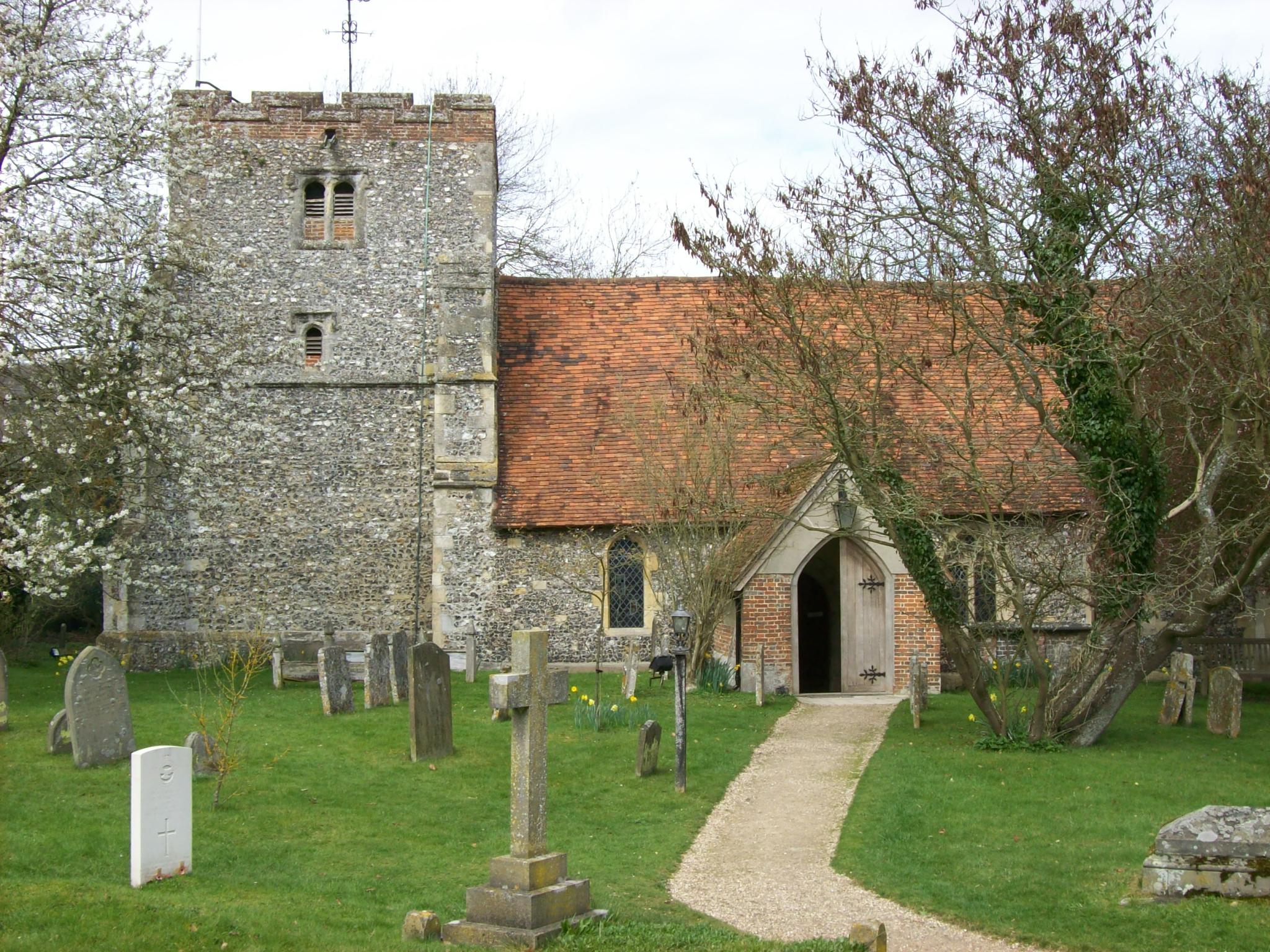

- Location in Buckinghamshire
- Location: Turville
- Country: England
- Denomination: Church of England
- Previous denomination: Roman Catholic
- Website: Website

History
- Status: Church
- Founded: 12th century
- Dedication: Virgin Mary

Architecture
- Functional status: Active
- Heritage designation: Grade II*
- Architectural type: Church
- Style: Gothic

Administration
- Diocese: Oxford
- Deanery: Wycombe
- Benefice: Hambleden Valley

Clergy
- Bishop: Steven Croft
- Rector: Rev Andy Storch

The Church of St Mary the Virgin is a 12th century English church located in Turville, Buckinghamshire, England. The Church is usually open daily from 10 am to 4 pm.

== History ==
The church is first recorded in the 12th century. It was built mainly using flint, principally due to its sole availability in the Middle Ages. The nave of the church is the oldest surviving part, dating from the early 12th century. In 1340, the present bell tower was built and the chancel was enlarged. The four bells in the tower date from 1670 and 1744. A fifth bell was added in the late 1990s for the millennium and the sixth bell was added in 2018

Further changes to the church were made in 1733, with the addition of the north aisle, which aimed to house the pew for the Lord of the Manor, William Perry. The north aisle also includes a marble monument to William Perry. Two armorial glass windows in the south wall commemorate the connection of the Parry family with the church.

== Restoration ==
The church was restored on numerous occasions, notably in 1875 when the chancel floor was raised, in 1901 when the vestry was constructed, in 1972 when the roof was repaired and, in 1996 with the new bell-frame and re-tuned peal. The 1901 restoration uncovered a stone coffin containing two skeletons, one dating from the 16th century which had a hole in the skull, indicating a possible murder victim. Today, the coffin stands in front of the north aisle. The coffin might have been used as an ossuary during a time when the churchyard became overcrowded.

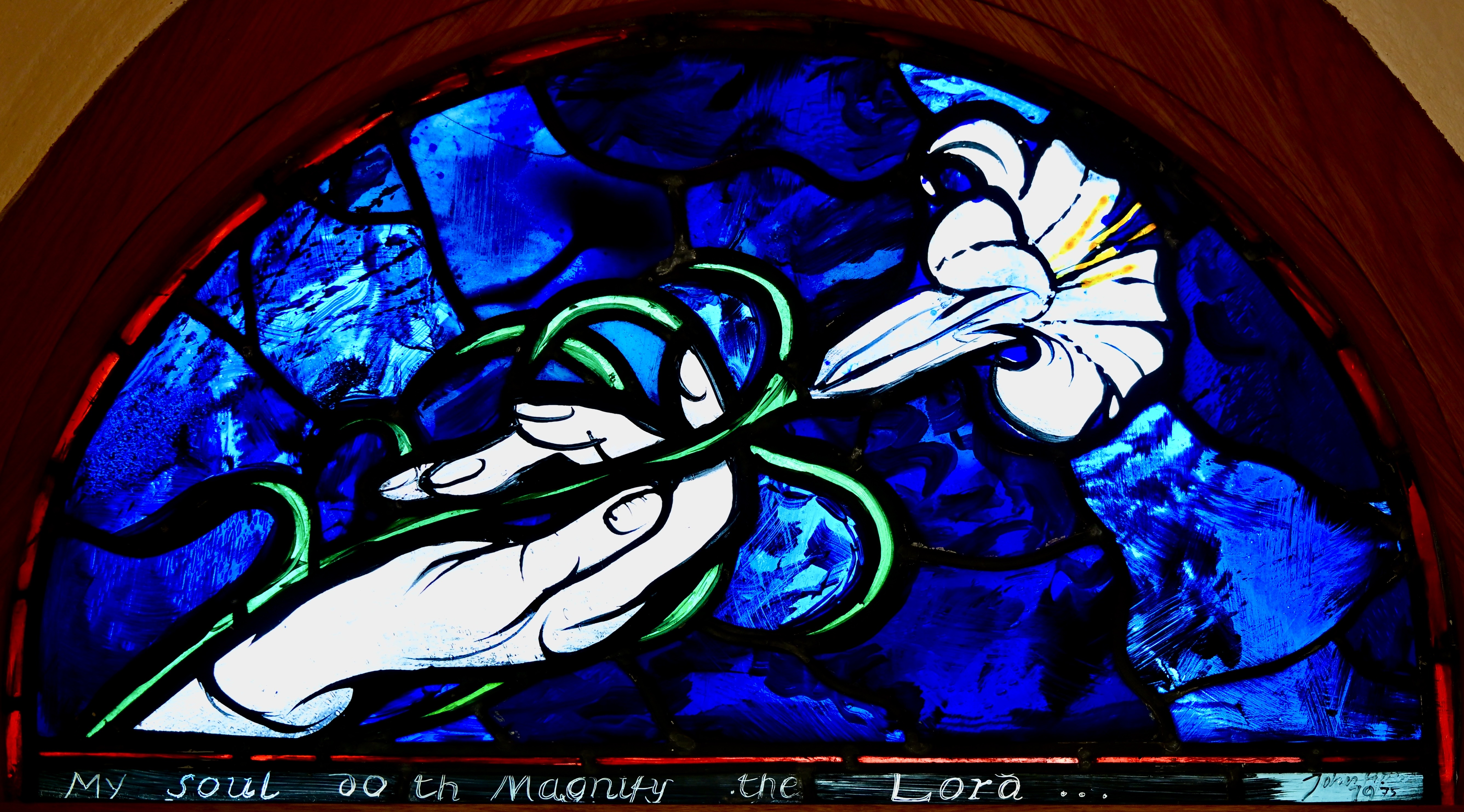
Lunette window by John Piper

A stained glass window set in the lunette above the north door was installed in 1975 to commemorate the nearby church of St Saviour in Turville Heath which was deconsecrated in 1972. Designed by John Piper and manufactured by Patrick Reyntiens, it depicts a hand holding a white Easter Lily on a variegated blue background. The inscription at its base reads my soul doth magnify the Lord…, an English translation of the first line of the Magnificat.

== Popular culture ==
The church was a key location in the 1942 film Went the Day Well? It was also used in the sitcom The Vicar of Dibley, where it was used as the parish church named St Barnabus' [sic].
