= Funboys =

BBC comedy TV show from 2025 set in Northern Ireland

- Genre: Sitcom
- Created by: Rian Lennon; Ryan Dylan
- Written by: Rian Lennon; Ryan Dylan
- Directed by: Rian Lennon
- Starring: Ryan Dylan; Lee R. James; Rian Lennon; Ele McKenzie
- Country of origin: United Kingdom (Northern Ireland)
- Original language: English
- No. of series: 2
- No. of episodes: 8

Production
- Executive producers: Simon Mayhew-Archer]; Ryan Dylan; Rian Lennon
- Producer: Leah Draws
- Running time: 22-24 mins
- Production company: Mayhay Studios

Original release
- Network: BBC Three; BBC Northern Ireland
- Release: 10 February 2025 - present

Funboys is a Northern Irish television sitcom first broadcast on BBC Three as a short film on 26 May 2023. It was followed by a four-episode series that premiered on 10 February 2025 on BBC Northern Ireland, and on 13 February 2025 on BBC Three. The show is about three emotionally stunted young men in a small town in Northern Ireland.

== Cast and characters ==
- Ryan Dylan as Callum: A young man who is timid, confused, sad, and afraid, but has a close bond with his two friends Jordan and Lorcan.
- Rian Lennon as Jordan: an emotionally insecure and selfish friend to Callum and Lorcan
- Lee R. James as Lorcan: a wise and kind-hearted young man who acts like a mother hen to Callum and Jordan.
- Ele McKenzie as Gemma: Gemma is the love interest of both Callum and Lorcan.
- Owen Colgan as Frank Lynch

== Short film ==
The 14-minute short film was filmed on location in Northern Ireland. At the BBC Comedy Festival in May 2024, it was announced that the short film would be expanded into a four-episode series.

== Episodes ==
=== Series 1 (2025) ===
No.	Title	Directed by	Written by	Original release date
1	"Much Ado About Nuttin'"	Rian Lennon	Rian Lennon & Ryan Dylan	10 February 2025
While working at the local shop, Callum acquires his first-ever female admirer in the form of Gemma, who is new to town and seeking friends. Unfortunately, Callum's burgeoning relationship means that he no longer wants to play video games all weekend with the fellas. This is too much for Jordan to bear and the PSNI are called to restrain him (again). Despite Jordan's warnings about the devastating dangers of post-nut depression, Callum goes on his first-ever date. And things are going well until he gets an urgent call from Lorcan about a friend in peril: Jordan has jumped off a bridge in the village.
2	"Once Upon a Time in Ballymacnoose"	Rian Lennon	Rian Lennon & Ryan Dylan	10 February 2025
After a gas leak at his flat, Callum moves in with Lorcan and his dad, Sammy, aka the biggest git in Ballymacnoose. Driven by a desire to no longer be a pushover, and in a desperate attempt to get over his break-up with Gemma, Callum goes under Sammy’s wing and unleashes his own inner git. Meanwhile, Jordan's two dads are finally tying the knot, and Jordan is caught up in all the excitement of the wedding. But whilst Jordan's attention is focused on suit fittings and stag dos, Callum's transition to a bad boy has the potential to cause irreparable damage to the funboys' friendship.
3	"Pigs in Sleeping Bags"	Rian Lennon	Rian Lennon & Ryan Dylan	10 February 2025
With Callum now unwelcome at Boggins' farm and his flat still out of bounds because of a gas leak, Callum turns once more to his friend, Jordan. And things seem to be going well – Jordan's two dads show Callum some much-needed sympathy and introduce him to the foreign concept of "talking about his feelings." Unfortunately this new-found bond doesn't go down so well with Jordan. Meanwhile, Gemma brings home a pet and unwittingly causes Lorcan to relive some very painful memories.
4	"Friends Forever"	Rian Lennon	Rian Lennon & Ryan Dylan	10 February 2025
Gemma and Lorcan throw a party at Boggins' farm and it's the biggest social event in Ballymacnoose with a whole eight people attending. One of those attendees is Gemma's brother, David, who is tall, cool and very emotionally articulate. And weirdest of all, he seems genuinely interested in being friends with Callum. Meanwhile, Gemma finds one of her old personality quirks coming to the fore again as she struggles to maintain her identity amidst the Lorcan's old-fashioned country charm. And while Callum focuses on his new friendship with David, Jordan decides to branch out himself and become mates with Frank.

=== Series 2 (2026) ===
No.	Title	Directed by	Written by	Original release date
1	"Blight at the Museum"	Rian Lennon	Rian Lennon & Ryan Dylan	2026
Callum goes full method, role-playing a starving peasant with a tyrannical land steward (Steve Coogan) as the Funboys belatedly get involved in the Great Famine.
2	"Misery Loves Cuckoldry"	Rian Lennon	Rian Lennon & Ryan Dylan	2026
strange things are afoot in Ballymacnoose:animals in small clothing, paranormal sightings of leprechauns. and most bizarrely of all, Callum gets his first match on a dating app.
3	"Eat ***, Pray, Love"	Rian Lennon	Rian Lennon & Ryan Dylan	2026
Life gets sticky in Ballymacnoose when Callum walks in on Gemma and Lorcan in bed. Meanwhile, Jordan's new lover, 50-year-old Grainne, points out his receding hairline.
4	"Ballymacbot Wars"	Rian Lennon	Rian Lennon & Ryan Dylan	2026
Callum slowly unravels under the strain of Jordan's relentless night terror about baldness until he stumbles upon a flyer for Ballymacbot Wars - a local robot combat tournament.

== Production ==
Funboys was filmed with the support of Northern Ireland Screen. The story is by Simon Mayhew-Archer.

Show co-writer and co-creator Ryan Dylan stated that the show was inspired by "mundanity meeting melodrama. The idea of three young men navigating life with unfiltered emotionality, while being completely clueless about what any of it means. Deep feelings colliding with shallow understanding. Also, low self-worth. Desperation." Lee R. James, who portrays Lorcan, said that the show "was inspired by the lack of representation of the rural folk who wander these lands. The small towns we grew up in are filled with oddities that deserve the spotlight."

== Reception ==
Vicky Jessop of The Standard wrote that Funboys is as a "beautifully bonkers comedy" and a worthy successor to This Country. She stated: "heartwarming and naff in 'equal measure, this tiny gem is well worth a few hours of your time." The Belfast Telegraph described the show as "not exactly Derry Girls but it’s beautifully bonkers" and "quirky and desperately bingeable."
