= Henceforward... =

Play by Alan Ayckbourn

- Programme from world première
- Written by: Alan Ayckbourn
- Characters: Jerome; Corinna; Geain; Lupus; NAN 300F; Zoe; Mervyn; Mary Hope-Fitch; Rita
- Original language: English
- Genre: Comedy Science Fiction
- Setting: A London apartment, in the near future.

Premiere
- Date premiered: 21 May 1987
- Place premiered: Stephen Joseph Theatre (Westwood site), Scarborough
- Official website

The play Henceforward... is the first comedy in which Alan Ayckbourn includes elements of science fiction. It concerns Jerome, a composer, who develops a plan to persuade his estranged wife Corinna that his home life is sufficiently stable for her to allow their daughter to stay with him. The plan involves both an actress and a gynoid (the female equivalent of an android).

Henceforward... was Ayckbourn's thirty-fourth full-length play. It was first performed at the Stephen Joseph Theatre in Scarborough in 1987. It received its West End premiere at the Vaudeville Theatre on the Strand, London in October 1988. The cast in Scarborough and London included Ian McKellen (who was knighted in 1990, becoming Sir Ian McKellen) as Jerome, Jane Asher as Corinna, Emma Chambers as Geain aged 13, Serena Evans as Zoe, Robin Herford as Lupus, Suzy Newman as Rita, and Michael Simkins as Mervyn. This production won the 1989 Best Comedy category at the Evening Standard Awards for London theatre.

== Characters ==
- Jerome, a composer
- Corinna, his wife
- Geain, their daughter
  - Aged 13
  - Aged 9 (video only)
- Lupus, his friend (video only)
- NAN 300F, an android
- Zoe, an actress
- Mervyn, a civil servant
- Mary Hope-Fitch, an escort (video only)
- Rita, a gang leader (video only)

NAN 300F is played in act 1 by the actress who plays Corinna in act 2, and in act 2 by the actress who plays Zoe in act 1.

== Plot details ==
The play is in two acts, the first of which has two scenes. It is set in London, England, in the future but "sometime quite soon". It is a bleak future where law and order has broken down in at least some parts of the city, and social interaction is limited by the automation of many shops and services. Composer Jerome has been estranged from his wife Corinna (a bank manager) for four years. Their 13-year-old daughter, Geain (pronounced Jane) lives with her mother. Jerome has been unable to compose music since they left and is convinced he needs Geain back with him to be his inspiration.

=== Act 1 ===
The action takes place in Jerome's very untidy and neglected flat. Before the play begins, Jerome has arranged a meeting with wife Corinna and Mervyn Bickerdyke from the Department of Child Wellbeing, to convince them that it will be appropriate for Geain to stay with him for long visits. Geain is also due to come to the meeting. To help to convince them, Jerome plans to hire an actress, Zoe Mill, from an escort agency, to pose as his fiancée. The first act takes place one week before the meeting as he interviews Zoe for the job. Before she arrives, Jerome activates his NAN 300F – a female android (or gynoid) whom he calls Nan. He treats Nan, who was originally designed to look after children, almost like a pet. Much of the play's humour originates from her idiosyncrasies as she collides with the furniture, blurts out unexpected remarks, and performs her tasks incompetently – such as serving a drink with the tumbler upside down.

Zoe's arrival establishes the hostile nature of the neighbourhood, as she has been mugged by a local gang (the "Daughters of Darkness") – led by Rita. Most of the first scene of Act 1 involves the explanation of Jerome's composing, his writer's block, his need for Geain's return, his plan to act out a stable home life with Zoe, and the breakdown in law and order. Jerome describes how he writes his music by sampling real life sounds and manipulating them. Several times he plays back dialogue which has taken place on stage or in rooms off-stage. He explains that he wants to write a piece which encapsulates the concept of love – but he has been searching for four years for the right sound to sample. The action on stage is interrupted by several video sequences involving comings and goings at the front door, film of Geain when she was 9 years old, and video answerphone messages from Jerome's friend Lupus and from Mervyn. Rita, Lupus and the younger Geain only ever appear on video, as does Mary Hope-Fitch from the agency which supplied Zoe.

Because of her dispute with the Daughters of Darkness Zoe is forced to stay the night and agrees to sleep with Jerome. Act 1 scene 2 begins the next morning with Jerome working on two short compositions using secretly sampled sounds of Zoe. The first, using her laugh, she finds entertaining although she suggests some changes. The second, using sounds of their love-making, horrify her and after arguing she exits in disgust, never to reappear. This leaves Jerome with nobody to act as though she is his fiancée at next week's meeting. As he experiments with using Nan to create new sounds, he suddenly has the idea of having Nan play the part instead of an actress. The act ends as he removes the back of her head in preparation for re-programming.

=== Act 2 ===
Act 2 takes place on the day of the meeting with Corinna and Mervyn. The flat has been dramatically tidied and re-arranged. Jerome is rehearsing Nan in her role as the perfect female companion. He has re-programmed her to respond to the name Zoe, and has changed her appearance to match. In fact in this act Nan/Zoe is now played by the actress who played the real Zoe in Act 1. However she still has the same humorous flaws, movements and habits. She has also been programmed to respond to certain trigger words using phrases and actions which Jerome anticipates will be useful – but comedy results from the unexpected use of the trigger words in normal conversation.

When Corinna (wife) arrives with Mervyn it is clear that when we saw Nan in act 1, Jerome had modelled her on Corinna. In fact the actress who played Nan (the robot) in act 1 now plays Corinna (the wife) in act 2. Geain doesn't arrive at this point as she has gone to visit a shop first. We first see her on the video screen at the door to the flat. Because of her masculine hair and clothing Jerome initially mistakes her for a local hooligan, and she enters looking surly, unwashed and very unfeminine – in complete contrast to the delightful 9-year-old girl shown on screen in Act 1. This makes Jerome very upset. Nan/Zoe's child-minding programming kicks in and she takes Geain to the kitchen for a drink. When they return shortly afterwards Nan/Zoe has transformed Geain, who is now clean, feminine and wearing a night-dress. She is still uncooperative, but has already developed a degree of respect for Nan/Zoe who takes her to the bedroom to put her to bed.

Corinna breaks down and admits that she is unable to cope with their rebellious daughter and agrees that Jerome can look after her – especially as Nan/Zoe has had such an immediate impact. Eventually she confesses that she had hoped this meeting would lead to a reconciliation between her and Jerome. Jerome is delighted by this and tells Corinna that Nan/Zoe is only an actress. Corinna is hurt by the deception and calls Geain from the bedroom so that they can leave. Geain reveals that her discovery that Nan/Zoe is actually an android – but she likes her and wants to stay with her. Under Mervyn's questioning Jerome explains that Nan/Zoe is a NAN 300F. Mervyn explains that the company which made them went out of business following a tragic incident with a baby. Jerome argues in defence of Nan/Zoe but Mervyn and Corinna try to separate her from Geain. Geain doesn't want to be separated. Nan/Zoe mistakes Mervyn for a child molester and knocks him unconscious for a while.

When he recovers Mervyn, Corinna and Geain prepare to leave hurriedly as they have had a call to tell them that their car is under siege by the Daughters of Darkness. Corinna offers Jerome a final chance to leave all his equipment behind and come to live with her and Geain, because they still love him. As he rapidly packs a few items they exit for the car, but as Jerome is on the brink of leaving, he realises that Corinna's speech about loving him may be the solution to writing his musical piece about love. He quickly returns to the flat and replays parts of the speech, isolating and manipulating one phrase which is indeed "the sound" which he has been waiting four years to hear. He feeds the sound sample into his complex equipment, and for the last three minutes of the play we hear the final piece as he creates it. While this takes place, he remains oblivious to the video screen on which the audience sees Mervyn, Corinna and Geain hammering at the door in a vain attempt to persuade him to come with them. Eventually they give up. Whether or not they escape the Daughters of Darkness is not seen, but they are replaced at the door by Rita who attempts to break it down, and then smashes the camera.

Jerome completes his composition and is briefly ecstatic, but the sound of violence outside brings him back to full awareness. He realises that to complete his music he has given up the chance of a reconciliation with his wife and child, and has put them in danger. He is distraught as the curtain closes.

== Reception ==
The Guardian's Michael Billington listed Henceforward... as one of the five greatest dystopian dramas and wrote that the play works because "Ayckbourn himself is both a techno-junkie and intelligent enough to see the dangers of a world in which we start to prefer rational machines to to [sic] irrational human beings."

== Staging considerations ==
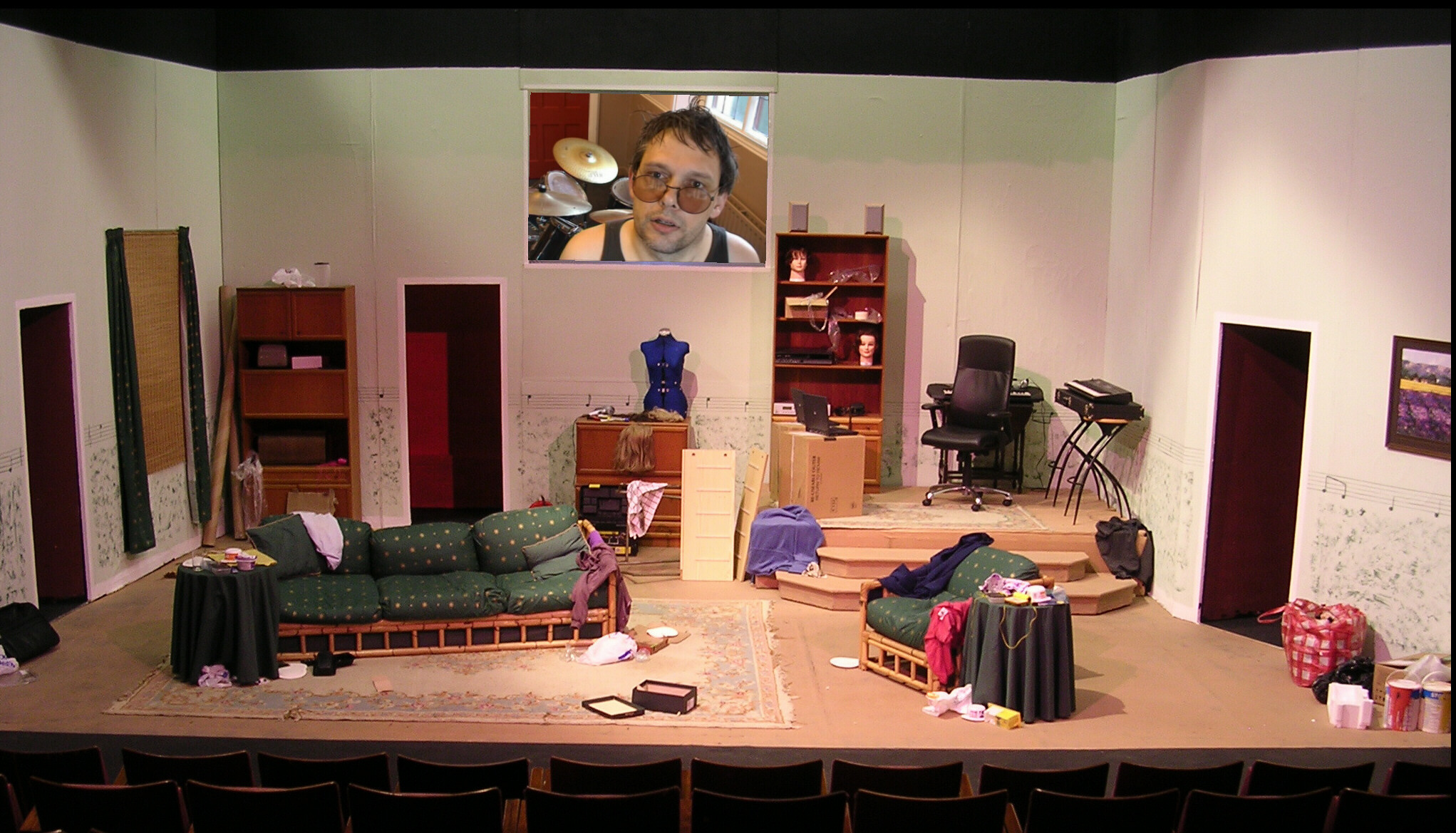
Henceforward... set (Midland Players 2006)

There are several unusual aspects to this play which make it difficult to produce:

The play is set in the near future but was written in 1987. The references to the technology of the future are sometimes accurate and sometimes not, but they are largely obsolete. A modern production therefore has to choose whether to perform the play as written, update the technology references (subject to permission) or to set the play in an "alternative" future where the author's predictions have all come true.

There are more than 30 sound and video clips which must be recorded in advance and played on cue. Alternatively some can be live feeds from backstage, or recorded during the performance and replayed.

The final musical piece should really contain sound samples from the actual actors in the production. This may require a composer familiar with sampling.

The actresses who play Corinna and Zoe must be of a similar physical build as they both also play the NAN 300F.
