= Simon Mayhew-Archer =

British TV comedy writer and producer

- Occupations: TV Writer and Television Producer
- Relatives: Paul Mayhew-Archer (father); Julie Mayhew-Archer (mother)
- Writing career
- Subject: Comedy
- Notable work: Can You Keep a Secret? (2026)

Simon Mayhew-Archer is a British TV comedy writer and producer. He wrote the 2026 BBC comedy Can You Keep a Secret?. The premise was partially inspired by his father, TV comedy writer Paul Mayhew-Archer, who was diagnosed with Parkinson's disease in 2011.

Mayhew-Archer also produced the BBC sitcoms This Country and Josh, and executive produced Funboys. He received a British Academy Television Award for This Country in 2018.
