= Frequently Asked Questions About Time Travel =

2009 film by Gareth Carrivick

- UK theatrical poster
- Directed by: Gareth Carrivick
- Written by: Jamie Mathieson
- Produced by: Neil Peplow; Justin Anderson Smith
- Starring: Chris O'Dowd; Dean Lennox Kelly; Marc Wootton; Anna Faris
- Cinematography: John Pardue
- Edited by: Stuart Gazzard; Christopher Blunden
- Music by: James L. Venable
- Production companies: HBO Films; BBC Films
- Distributed by: Warner Bros. Entertainment (United States)
- Release date: 24 April 2009 (United Kingdom)
- Running time: 83 minutes
- Countries: United Kingdom; United States
- Language: English

Frequently Asked Questions About Time Travel (stylised as FAQ About Time Travel) is a 2009 science fiction comedy film directed by Gareth Carrivick from a script by Jamie Mathieson, starring Chris O'Dowd, Dean Lennox Kelly, Marc Wootton and Anna Faris.

The film follows two avid science fiction fans (O'Dowd and Wootton) and their snarky mate (Kelly) as they attempt to navigate a time travel conundrum in the middle of a British pub, where they meet a girl from the future (Faris) who sets the adventure in motion.

It was released in the UK and Ireland on 24 April 2009.

== Plot ==
Ray, recently fired from his job as a theme park guide, spends the evening with his friends Pete and Toby at the cinema and later at a pub. There, they write a satirical "Letter to Hollywood" criticising bad films, using a page from Toby’s notebook. Ray encounters a woman named Cassie, who claims to be a time traveller working to fix "time leaks." She warns him about "Editors," operatives from the future who eliminate artists at their peak to preserve cultural standards. Ray believes the encounter is a prank arranged by his friends; they deny it and think he is making up meeting Cassie.

Soon after, Pete experiences a bizarre vision of a massacre at the pub, including a bearded version of himself. The group discovers a time leak in the men's toilet, which allows them to travel 30 minutes into the past and encounter earlier versions of themselves. Cassie returns, stating she has repaired the leak, but anomalies continue to occur. They enter a post-apocalyptic version of the pub, and Pete briefly disappears into the time leak, returning dishevelled and traumatized. The group attempts to avoid paradoxes caused by interacting with their past selves. During a party at the pub that is themed around their future selves, they meet Millie, another time traveller who claims to be Cassie's mentor but is later revealed to be an Editor sent to kill them at the moment of their greatest potential.

Believing the "Letter to Hollywood" may be responsible for their future fame, Ray, Pete, and Toby consider destroying it to prevent Millie’s interference. Millie incapacitates Cassie and offers to make them legends in exchange for the paper, but they refuse. A confrontation ensues, and Millie appears to kill everyone in the pub. An earlier version of Pete enters, witnesses the aftermath, and flees. A severely injured Ray spills beer on the paper, rendering it illegible. This act triggers a reset of the timeline, returning the trio to their original state at the pub, with full memories of the events, but with the paper destroyed. As they leave, believing the situation resolved, Cassie reappears through a portal, now claiming she and Ray have been in a relationship in an alternate timeline. She warns of widespread time leaks and urges them to help save the world within fourteen hours. The group agrees to follow her into a parallel universe.

In mid- and post-credits scenes, multiple versions of Pete and Toby appear, suggesting ongoing complications from the time travel events.

== Cast ==
- Chris O'Dowd as Ray
- Dean Lennox Kelly as Pete
- Marc Wootton as Toby
- Anna Faris as Cassie
- Meredith MacNeill as Millie

== Home media ==
The DVD was released on 7 September 2009 in the UK. The film was also released DTV by HBO.

== Production ==
The film is a co-production between HBO Films and BBC Films. It was filmed at Pinewood Studios in the UK. The credits of the film include thanks to "The Wheatsheaf Pub".

=== Design ===
The opening credits appear in outline block letters in light blue against the background of space, in the same style as the Superman films.

Many of the promotional items for this movie feature a stylised image from the film, of the male leads, standing in a similar pose to Michael J. Fox and Christopher Lloyd in posters from the Back to the Future franchise.

== Reception ==
Critical reception has been mixed. In January 2023, the film had a 35% approval rating on the review aggregator Rotten Tomatoes, based on 20 reviews.

Empire magazine's review concluded, "Quirky and engaging with a script that keeps you on the ride." The review for the Daily Mirror's verdict was, "This engaging comedy feels like a stretched-out TV pilot, but is nicely put together, with enough laughs to make a refreshing change from usual Brit film fare."

The Irish Times described it as a "mildly diverting yarn" but was critical of the small scale of the film and the apparently limited budget. Peter Bradshaw reviewed the film for The Guardian and wrote that it was "the worst film of the week, a dire British comedy, to which the only honest response is to soil and then set fire to the Union flag in the foyer of your local cinema".

== Soundtrack ==
- "Kayleigh" - performed by The Countdown Singers
- "Slippin' and Slidin'" - performed by Rendle
- "Flea Circus" - performed by Marder
- "Geno" - performed by The Countdown Singers
- "The Land of Make Believe" - performed by Bucks Fizz
- "Rivers of Babylon" - performed by Boney M
- "Total Eclipse of the Heart" - performed by Bonnie Tyler
- "Magic" - performed by The Countdown Singers
- "The Final Countdown" - performed by Eskimo Disco
- "Humans" - performed by Ry Byron & The Gentlemen

== See also ==
- List of films featuring time loops
