= Paul Mayhew-Archer =

British script writer and producer

Paul Mayhew-Archer MBE
- Born: Paul William Archer; 6 January 1953 (age 73)
- Education: Eastbourne College
- Alma mater: St Catharine's College, Cambridge
- Occupations: Writer, television and radio producer, script editor
- Years active: 1987–present
- Organization: BBC
- Known for: The Vicar of Dibley; My Hero; Office Gossip; Old Harry's Game; Roald Dahl's Esio Trot; I'm Sorry I Haven’t A Clue; Radio Active
- Spouse: Julie M Mayhew (m. 1975)
- Children: 1 (Simon Mayhew-Archer)

Paul William Mayhew-Archer MBE (born 6 January 1953) is a British writer, producer, script editor and actor for the BBC. He is best known as the co-writer of The Vicar of Dibley and Esio Trot alongside Richard Curtis. His solo writing career includes My Hero and Office Gossip, which he created. He was the script editor for Old Harry's Game (which he also produces), Two Pints of Lager and a Packet of Crisps, Grownups, Home Again, Coming of Age and Big Top.

Mayhew-Archer is also an amateur actor who has appeared in Drop the Dead Donkey and Mrs. Brown's Boys.

In October 2020, he was appointed MBE for services to people with Parkinson's disease and cancer.

== Early life ==
Mayhew-Archer was born on 6 January 1953, as Paul William Archer; he attended Eastbourne College and went on to study English at St Catharine's College, Cambridge. He spent his spare time at school writing plays. While at Cambridge, he was a scriptwriter and performer with Andy Hamilton in the Cambridge University Light Entertainment Society.

== Career ==
Before becoming a script writer for the BBC, Mayhew-Archer was a Producer in the BBC Radio Light Entertainment Department, and before that was an English teacher.

His most notable works are The Vicar of Dibley (main co-writer with Richard Curtis, the series' creator) and My Hero (main co-writer with creator Paul Mendelson), although he has also script-edited Old Harry's Game (which he also produces), Two Pints of Lager and a Packet of Crisps, Grownups, Home Again, Coming of Age and Big Top, as well as for the first series of Miranda. Episodes of Two Pints of Lager and a Packet of Crisps contain scenes set in fictional pubs called The Mayhew (first series only) and The Archer, both named after him. He co-wrote Roald Dahl's Esio Trot for BBC One. He also wrote An Actor's Life for Me, a situation comedy series on radio and television, which starred John Gordon Sinclair as a struggling young actor. His other significant radio credits include producing I'm Sorry I Haven't a Clue, Radio Active, and The Million Pound Radio Show.

In addition, Mayhew-Archer appeared on screen in an episode of Drop the Dead Donkey (1996) and as a Life Insurance Officer in the first episode of the second series of Mrs. Brown's Boys.

Mayhew-Archer started performing Stand-up comedy about his Parkinson's Disease diagnosis in 2017. In 2018 he performed his solo stand-up comedy show 'Incurable Optimist' at the Edinburgh Fringe Festival.

=== Podcast ===
In 2018 he appeared in a podcast with the Archbishop of Canterbury. Since March 2023 Mayhew-Archer has contributed to a podcast 'Movers and Shakers' which is "about life with Parkinson's". Recordings are made in a Notting Hill pub and presenters (Rory Cellan-Jones, Gillian Lacey-Solymar, Mark Mardell, Paul Mayhew-Archer, Sir Nicholas Mostyn and Jeremy Paxman) discuss "the highs and lows, trials and tribulations, of living with the condition". In March 2024 The UK Broadcasting Press Guild made 'Movers and Shakers' its 'UK Podcast of the Year'.

== Personal life ==
Mayhew-Archer resides in Abingdon, Oxfordshire, with his wife Julie (née Mayhew), whom he married in 1975. The couple have one son together, TV comedy writer and producer Simon Mayhew-Archer, writer of Can You Keep a Secret?, partially inspired by his father's Parkinson's disease diagnosis, which Paul Mayhew-Archer was diagnosed with in 2011.
