= The Vicar of Dibley =

British TV sitcom, 1994–2007

- Genre: Sitcom
- Written by: Richard Curtis, Paul Mayhew-Archer and Kit Hesketh-Harvey.
- Directed by: Dewi Humphreys (series 1–2); Gareth Carrivick (series 3); Martin Dennis (2004–5 specials); Ed Bye (2006–7 specials); Barbara Wiltshire (lockdown episodes)
- Starring: Dawn French; Emma Chambers; Trevor Peacock; Gary Waldhorn; James Fleet; John Bluthal; Liz Smith; Roger Lloyd-Pack
- Opening theme: "The Lord Is My Shepherd"
- Composer: Howard Goodall
- Country of origin: United Kingdom
- Original language: English
- No. of series: 3
- No. of episodes: 20 (not including charity and lockdown specials) (list of episodes)

Production
- Executive producers: Richard Curtis; Peter Bennett-Jones; Ben Caudell
- Producers: Jon Plowman; Sue Vertue (Series 2); Margot Gavan Duffy (Series 3)
- Editors: Mark Sangster (Series 1); Graham Carr (Series 1); Chris Wadsworth (Series 2); Mark Lawrence (Series 3)
- Running time: 30–40 minutes (regular episodes); 40–55 minutes (specials); 4–14 minutes (charity and lockdown specials)
- Production company: Tiger Aspect Productions

Original release
- Network: BBC One
- Release: 10 November 1994 – 1 January 2000
- Release: 24 December 2004 – 1 January 2007
- Release: 7 December – 23 December 2020

The Vicar of Dibley is a British sitcom. It consists of three series, which aired on BBC One from 10 November 1994 to 1 January 2000, and several specials, the most recent of which aired on 23 December 2020. It is set in the fictional Oxfordshire village of Dibley, which is assigned a female vicar following the 1993 changes in the Church of England that permitted the ordination of women. Dawn French plays the lead role of vicar Geraldine Granger.

In ratings terms, it is among the most successful British programmes in the digital era, with the Christmas and New Year specials entering the UK top 10 programmes of the year. The Vicar of Dibley received multiple British Comedy Awards, two International Emmys and was a multiple British Academy Television Awards nominee. In 2004, it placed third in a BBC poll of Britain's Best Sitcoms.

== Premise ==
=== Background ===
The series was created by Richard Curtis and written for actress Dawn French by Curtis and Paul Mayhew-Archer, with contributions from Kit Hesketh-Harvey. The main character was an invention of Richard Curtis, and he and French extensively consulted Joy Carroll, one of the first female Anglican priests, and garnered many character traits and much information.

=== Openings and epilogues ===
In earlier episodes, the opening credits were followed by a humorous village scene, such as a woman knitting directly from a sheep.

After the closing credits, Geraldine usually tells Alice a joke, which Alice either overreacts to, tries to interpret literally, or understands only after Geraldine explains it. There are a few exceptions to this in various episodes.

== Cast and characters ==
=== Main cast ===
Actor	Character	Episodes
Dawn French	Geraldine Granger	20 (+ 6 Comic Relief & 4 Lockdown specials)
Gary Waldhorn	Cllr David Horton MBE FRCS	20 (+ 5 Comic Relief specials)
James Fleet	Hugo Horton	20 (+ 6 Comic Relief & 3 Lockdown specials)
Emma Chambers	Alice Horton (née Tinker), the verger	20 (+ 4 Comic Relief specials)
Roger Lloyd-Pack	Owen Newitt	20 (+ 5 Comic Relief specials)
Trevor Peacock	Jim Trott	20 (+ 6 Comic Relief specials)
John Bluthal	Frank Pickle	20 (+ 3 Comic Relief specials)
Liz Smith	Letitia Cropley	7

=== Recurring cast ===
Actor	Character	Episodes
Richard Armitage	Harry Kennedy	2 (+ 1 Comic Relief special)
Simon McBurney	Cecil, the Choirmaster	4
Clive Mantle	Simon Horton	2
Peter Capaldi	Tristan Campbell	2
Patricia Kane	Doris Trott	3
Keeley Hawes	Rosie Kennedy	2
Edward Kelsey	Mr Harris	2
Gareth Vaughan	Gonads, the tenor	5 (4 of which uncredited)

=== Guest appearances ===
Hugh Bonneville, Mel Giedroyc, Richard Griffiths, Miranda Hart, Alistair McGowan, Geraldine McNulty, Philip Whitchurch, Nathalie Cox, Nicholas Le Prevost, Brian Perkins (playing Rowan Williams, the then-Archbishop of Canterbury), and Roger Sloman have all made one guest appearance each.

Pam Rhodes, Kylie Minogue, Rachel Hunter, Terry Wogan, Jeremy Paxman, Martyn Lewis, Darcey Bussell, and Sean Bean each appeared as themselves in one episode.

Sarah, Duchess of York, Richard Ayoade, Orla Brady, Fiona Bruce, Annette Crosbie, Johnny Depp, Ruth Jones, Hilary Kay, Damian Lewis, Maureen Lipman, Jennifer Saunders, Sting and his wife Trudie Styler, Stephen Tompkinson, Dervla Kirwan, and Emma Watson have made guest appearances in short charity specials.

== Episodes ==
Series
Series	Episodes	Originally released		Ave. UK viewers (millions)
Series	Episodes	First released	Last released	Ave. UK viewers (millions)
1	6	10 November 1994	15 December 1994	TBA
Specials		8 April 1996	25 December 1996	TBA
2	4	26 December 1997	22 January 1998	TBA
3	4	24 December 1999	1 January 2000	13.53
Specials		25 December 2004	1 January 2005	12.05
Specials		25 December 2006	1 January 2007	12.74

The Vicar of Dibley has had 20 episodes as of 2007, with additional short reprises consisting of Comic Relief and the In Lockdown minis.

The first series was broadcast on BBC1 from 10 November to 15 December 1994, comprising six episodes. Following the first series, an Easter special and a Christmas special were broadcast in 1996. A four-episode second series was ordered and screened between 26 December 1997 and 22 January 1998. Subsequent episodes consisted of Christmas and New Year specials, followed by a third series of four episodes, also referred to as seasonal specials as they have the titles Autumn, Winter, Spring and Summer airing from 24 December 1999 to 1 January 2000. After that came the two-episode "A Very Dibley Christmas", broadcast between 25 December 2004 and 1 January 2005, and the two-part finale, "A Wholly Holy Happy Ending", broadcast on Christmas Day 2006 and New Year's Day 2007.

The final two episodes, in which Geraldine finds love and marries, are officially the "last-ever" episodes, although there have been several reappearances of certain characters since in the form of charity specials.

=== Comic Relief and Lockdown specials ===
On 15 March 2013, French reprised her role as Geraldine Granger as part of her French and Saunders marathon on BBC Radio 2. She was interviewed by Chris Evans on his Pause for Thought section. The following year, on 29 March 2014, French appeared in character as Granger on Thought for the Day on BBC Radio 4.

There have been eight short charity TV specials: six for Comic Relief between 1997 and 2015 and a seventh in April 2020, in which French appeared on The Big Night In as part of a joint Comic Relief and Children in Need special to support those affected by COVID-19. Due to the COVID-19 pandemic, the segment was filmed at French's home. For Comic Relief 2021, Geraldine appeared in the Dibley vicarage, later lip-synching to "Juice" by Lizzo and appearing with the reverend Kate Bottley.

In December 2020, a series of short "lockdown" episodes of The Vicar of Dibley were broadcast. The series consisted of three short episodes followed by a compilation episode of the previous three episodes' material shown back-to-back, but including previously unseen material and scenes. The style was completely different to the main series, with Geraldine and Hugo breaking the fourth wall via video messaging, talking directly to the viewers as if they were the Dibley congregation. The same method was used for the 2020 and 2021 Comic Relief shorts, also made and set during the Covid pandemic.

== Production ==
=== Location and setting ===
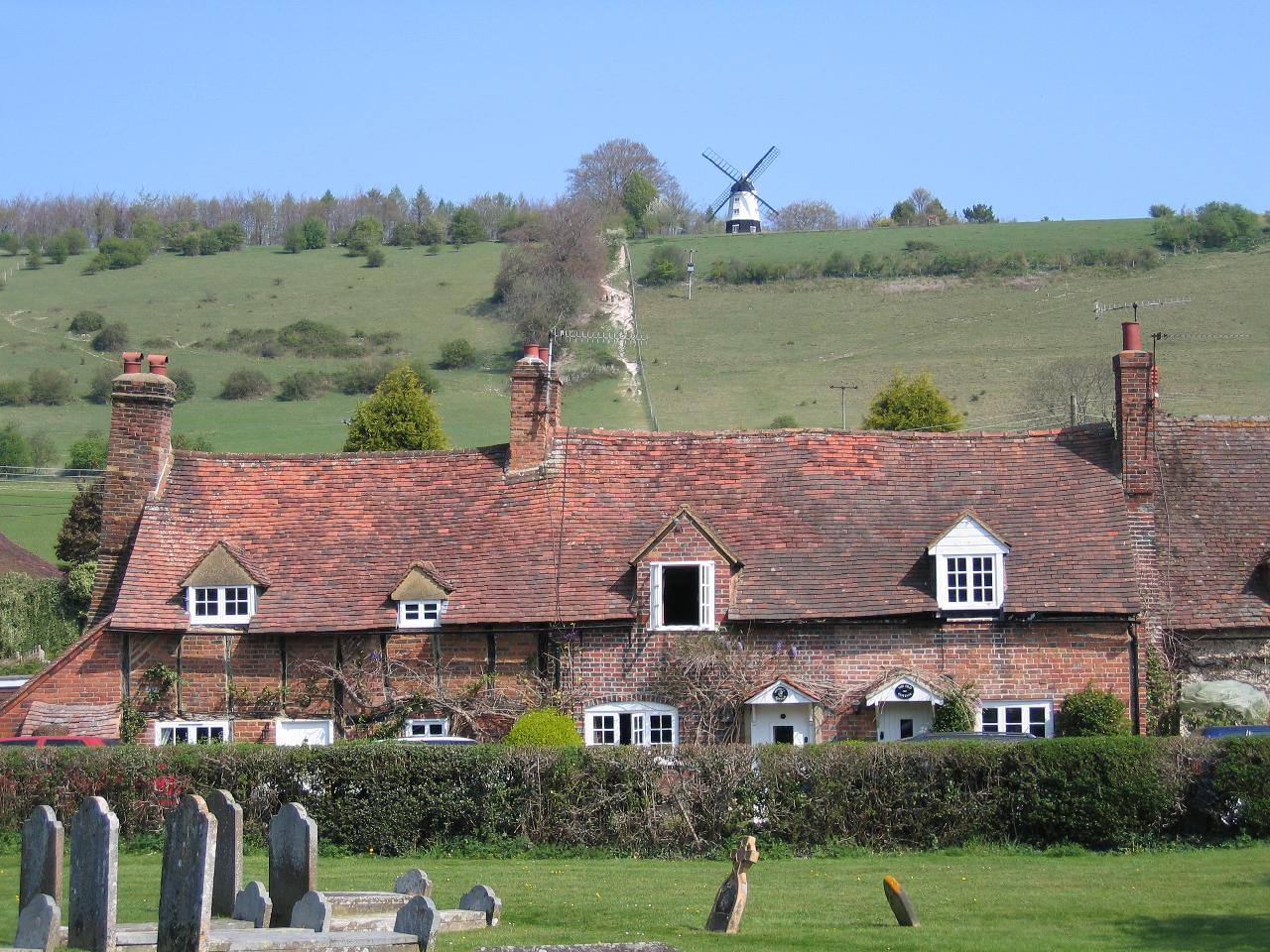
The village of Turville in Buckinghamshire stands in for the village of Dibley

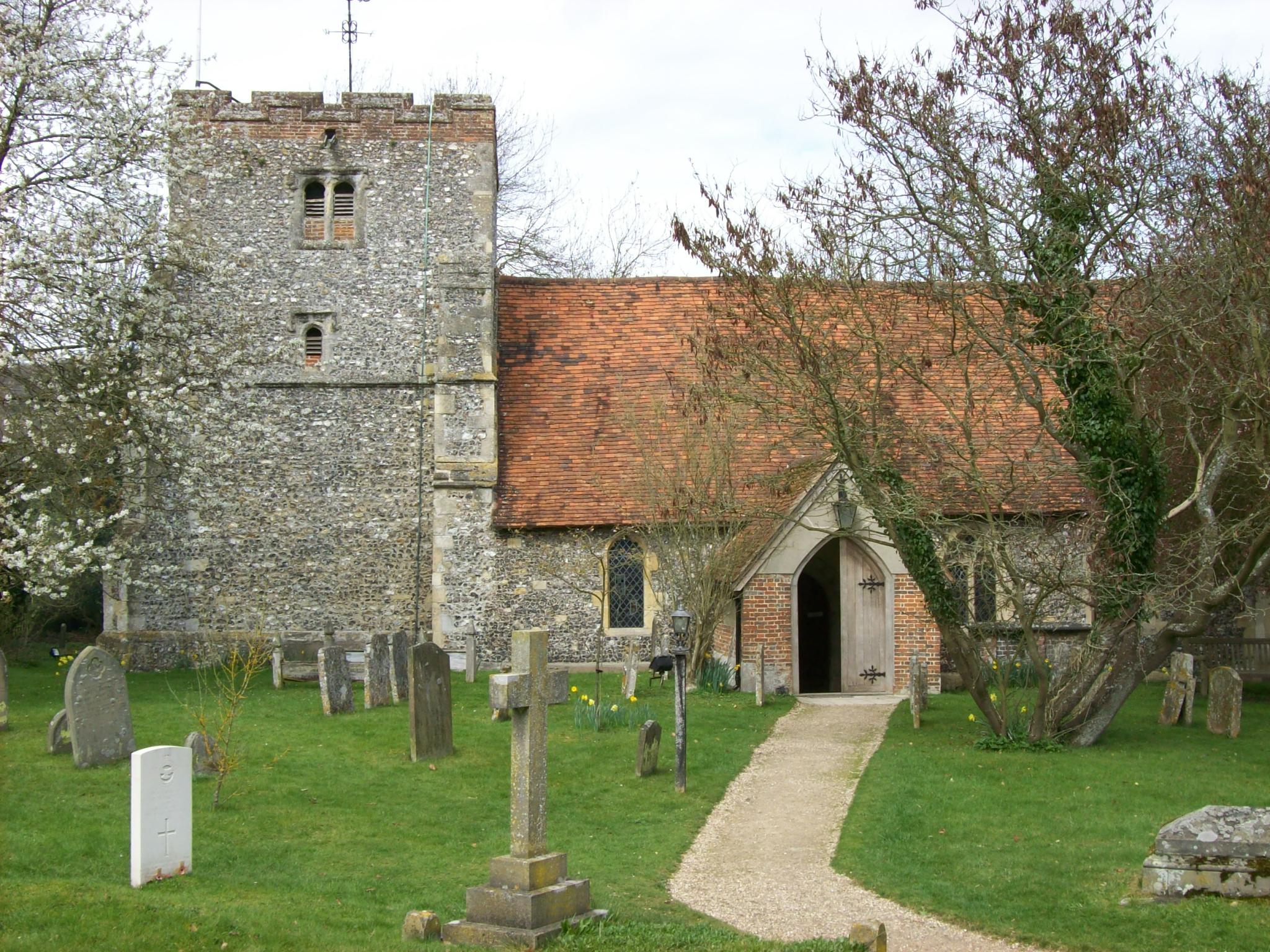
St Mary's Church, Turville, stands in for the fictional 'Parish Church of St Barnabus'

The programme is set in the fictional Oxfordshire village of Dibley, which should not be confused with the real Dibleys estate in Blewbury, South Oxfordshire. Some villagers, including Alice, Jim, and Owen, speak with slight West Country accents, as were once common in Oxfordshire, but are now less so. The series was filmed in the Buckinghamshire village of Turville, near High Wycombe, with the village's St Mary the Virgin Church doubling as Dibley's St Barnabus. The exterior location for David Horton's manor is in the village of Little Missenden, Buckinghamshire.

The opening titles show aerial shots of the M40 motorway's Stokenchurch Gap, the Chiltern Hills of Oxfordshire and Buckinghamshire, and the village of Turville.

=== Theme music ===
The theme music was a setting of Psalm 23 composed by Howard Goodall, and was performed by the choir of Christ Church Cathedral, Oxford, with George Humphreys singing the solo. The conductor was Stephen Darlington. Two versions are used over the opening credits: one with a full choir and one with a solo. Goodall originally wrote it as a serious piece of church choral music. It has been released as a charity single, with proceeds going to Comic Relief. It also appears on Goodall's CD Choral Works, which additionally includes his theme for Mr. Bean, another popular comedy co-created by Richard Curtis. A snippet of The Vicar of Dibley's theme music was used in the Mr. Bean episode "Tee Off, Mr. Bean" and the music from Mr Bean plays during Sean Bean's cameo in The Vicar of Dibley episode "Spring".

== Awards and accolades ==
Year	Award	Category	Nominee	Result
1997	British Comedy Awards	Best TV Comedy Actress	Dawn French	Won
1998	British Comedy Awards	Best TV Comedy Actress	Dawn French	Nominated
1998	British Comedy Awards	Best TV Comedy Actress	Emma Chambers	Won
1998	BAFTA Awards	Best Comedy (Programme or Series)	The Vicar of Dibley	Nominated
1998	BAFTA Awards	Best Comedy Performance	Dawn French	Nominated
1998	National Television Awards	Most Popular Comedy Performer	Dawn French	Nominated
1998	National Television Awards	Most Popular Comedy Programme	The Vicar of Dibley	Won
1998	RTS Television Award	Best Situation Comedy or Comedy Drama	The Vicar of Dibley	Won
1998	International Emmy	Popular Arts	The Vicar of Dibley	Won
1999	BAFTA Awards	Best Comedy (Programme or Series)	The Vicar of Dibley	Nominated
1999	National Television Awards	Most Popular Comedy Performer	Dawn French	Nominated
2000	National Television Awards	Most Popular Comedy Performer	Dawn French	Nominated
2000	National Television Awards	Most Popular Comedy Programme	The Vicar of Dibley	Nominated
2000	BAFTA Awards	Best Comedy Performance	Dawn French	Nominated
2000	BAFTA Awards	Suitation Comedy Awards	The Vicar of Dibley	Nominated
2000	BAFTA Awards	Lew Grade Award	The Vicar of Dibley	Nominated
2001	BAFTA Awards	Lew Grade Award	The Vicar of Dibley	Nominated
2001	BAFTA Awards	Best Comedy Performance	Dawn French	Nominated
2005	BAFTA Awards	Situation Comedy Award	The Vicar of Dibley	Nominated
2005	TV Quick Awards	Best Comedy Show	The Vicar of Dibley	Won
2007	BAFTA Awards	Best Comedy Performer	Dawn French	Nominated
2007	Banff Rockie Award	Best Comedy Program	The Vicar of Dibley	Nominated
2007	Rose d'Or Light Entertainment Festival	Golden Rose Award for Comedy	The Vicar of Dibley	Won
2021	National Television Awards	Comedy	The Vicar of Dibley (Lockdown Specials)	Nominated

The series also won the TV Choice Award for Best Comedy in 2005 and again in 2021 for the Lockdown Specials.

In May 2007, Richard Curtis received a BAFTA Academy Fellowship Award for his humanitarian pursuits, as well as his creative work, including The Vicar of Dibley.

== Home media ==
The Vicar of Dibley was released on VHS in North America periodically in volumes (six in total) between 1998 and 2000 by BBC Video, distributed by CBS/FOX Video

The Vicar of Dibley was released on DVD in Region 2 (UK) in 2001. In 2002, a DVD entitled The Best of The Vicar of Dibley was released featuring a 90-minute film of Dawn French talking to the producer, Jon Plowman, with clips from the series. A 2002 documentary narrated by Jo Brand, entitled The Real Vicars of Dibley, was also on the DVD. In 2005, a "complete collection" box set was released. This included all the then-aired episodes. The final two episodes and a 6-disc "ultimate" box set were released on 26 November 2007.

In Australasia (Region 4), all episodes have been released on DVD.

All episodes have been released on DVD in the United States and Canada (Region 1).

DVD Title	Discs	Year	Ep #	DVD release			Special episodes
DVD Title	Discs	Year	Ep #	Region 1	Region 2	Region 4	Special episodes
Complete Series 1	1	1994	6	21 October 2003	26 November 2001	1 October 2003	The 1996 Christmas special (R2)
The Specials	1	1996	2	—	2001		—
Complete Series 2	1	1997–1998	6	21 October 2003	2003	8 April 2004	The 1996 Easter special & Christmas special (R1 & R4)
Complete Series 3	1	1999–2000	4	21 October 2003	2003	2 March 2005	The 1997 & 1999 Comic Relief shorts (R1 & R4)
A Very Dibley Christmas	1	2004–2005	2	27 September 2005	14 November 2005	3 November 2005	The 1999 & 2005 Comic Relief short (All)
A Holy Wholly Happy Ending	1	2006–2007	2	9 October 2007	26 November 2007	16 January 2008	The Story Of The Vicar Of Dibley (1 hour BBC documentary, 31 December 2007)
Complete Series 1 & 2	2	1994–1998	10	—	7 May 2007	—	The 1996 Christmas special (R2)
Complete Series 1–3	3	1994–2000	16	21 October 2003	14 October 2019	—	—
Complete Series 1 – 2005 Sp.	4	1994–2005	18	—	14 November 2005	7 July 2005	—
Complete Series 1 – 2007 Sp.	6	1994–2007	20	9 October 2007	26 November 2007	3 April 2008	The Story Of The Vicar Of Dibley as well as several shorts
The Best of...	1	N/A	—	—	25 November 2002	—	Dawn French in conversation with producer John Plowman

== Legacy ==
=== Adaptations ===
On 6 February 2007, Fox announced plans to adapt The Vicar of Dibley into an American sitcom titled The Minister of Divine. The series starred Kirstie Alley as a former "wild child" who returned to her hometown as its first female minister. The pilot was broadcast on Fox, but the series was not made.

The series has also been adapted into two stage plays by Ian Gower and Paul Carpenter, both incorporating plots from the TV episodes. The first is titled The Vicar of Dibley, and is concerned mainly with Alice and Hugo's engagement and wedding. The second, A Vicar of Dibley Christmas – The Second Coming, is based on the episodes "Dibley Live" and "Winter", in which the villagers set up a radio station and put on a nativity play at Owen's farm. A third adaptation by Steve Clark and David Lovesy, titled The Vicar of Dibley - The Holy Trinity, covers Baby Geraldine's Christening, David Horton's brief wooing of Geraldine, and the Save Our Dibley campaign as a new reservoir threatens the village. Performance rights for all three are available through United Agents.

=== Possible return ===
In February 2016, it was reported that Dawn French was interested in returning to the role in a new series, The Bishop of Dibley, to follow on from the 2015 Red Nose Day Special. In December 2020, French opened up about the prospect of The Vicar of Dibley returning for a new series in 2021.

=== Comedy Classic: Vicar of Dibley ===
In December 2022, Channel 5 aired a 67-minute special retrospective for their "Comedy Classics" series. Actors and celebrities, including co-writer Paul Mayhew-Archer, take a look back, discuss and pay tribute to the show.

=== Postage stamps ===
In January 2025, Royal Mail issued a set of eight commemorative postage stamps depicting iconic characters and moments from the series.

== See also ==
British sitcom
