= Emma Chambers =

English actress (1964–2018)

- Chambers as Alice Tinker in The Vicar of Dibley
- Born: Emma Gwynedd Mary Chambers; 11 March 1964; Doncaster, West Riding of Yorkshire, England
- Died: 21 February 2018 (aged 53); Lymington, Hampshire, England
- Occupation: Actress
- Years active: 1987–2007
- Known for: Vicar of Dibley; Notting Hill
- Spouse: Ian Dunn (m. 1991)

Emma Gwynedd Mary Chambers (11 March 1964 – 21 February 2018) was an English actress and comedienne. She played Alice Tinker in the BBC comedy The Vicar of Dibley and Honey Thacker in the film Notting Hill (1999).

Beginning her career in 1987 on the British stage, Chambers first drew critical attention for her portrayals of teenage characters in the world premieres of two plays by Alan Ayckbourn at the Stephen Joseph Theatre in Scarborough: Geain in Henceforward... (1987) and Lucy Baines in Invisible Friends (1989). She reprised both roles in London's West End; performing the latter role at the Royal National Theatre.

== Early life ==
Chambers was born on 11 March 1964, in Doncaster, West Riding of Yorkshire, the daughter of John Chambers, a consultant obstetrician and gynaecologist, and his wife Noelle, née Strange. Her siblings are business owners Sarah Doukas and Simon Chambers, who created the modelling agency Storm Management. She attended St Mary's School and her secondary education was at St Swithun's School, Winchester, Hampshire. She then trained at the Webber Douglas Academy of Dramatic Art in the 1980s, where she was a classmate of actor Ross Kemp.

== Early stage career ==
Chambers began her career as a stage actress in the late 1980s as a member of the repertory company at the Stephen Joseph Theatre in Scarborough. There she appeared as Geain (pronounced "Jane") in the world premiere of Alan Ayckbourn's Henceforward... in 1987 with Ian McKellen and Jane Asher portraying her character's parents. She reprised the role the following year for her West End theatre debut at the Vaudeville Theatre. One of her other early stage appearances was in the role of Tillie in the world premiere of Paul Doust's If I Knew You Were Coming I'd Have Baked A Cake in May 1988 at The Old Red Lion, Islington.

In 1989 Chambers was nominated for a Radio Academy Award in the Best Actress category for her work in the BBC Radio 4 programme Girl of My Best Friend. That same year she starred in Giles Cole's Suspects at the Swansea Grand Theatre with Diana Kent, Roy Boyd, and Ben Onwukwe; and portrayed the central character of Lucy Baines in the world premiere of Alan Ayckbourn's Invisible Friends at the Stephen Joseph Theatre. She remained with the latter production when it moved to the Royal National Theatre in 1991; earning positive critical attention for her portrayal of a teenager who engages with an imaginary friend to escape her troubled home life.

In the autumn of 1991 Chambers was a member of Mark Brickman's repertory company at the Crucible Theatre in Sheffield, South Yorkshire where one of her roles was Celia in William Shakespeare's As You Like It. She returned to the Royal National Theatre in 1993 as Avonia Bunn in Arthur Wing Pinero's Trelawny of the 'Wells' under the direction of John Caird.

== Later career in television, film, and theatre ==
After taking some smaller parts on television productions such as The Bill, in November 1994, Chambers portrayed the role of Charity Pecksniff in the television serialisation of the Charles Dickens novel Martin Chuzzlewit. From 1994 to 2007, she portrayed the role of Alice Tinker in the BBC comedy The Vicar of Dibley. Chambers appeared in all 20 episodes and four Comic Relief specials until 2007. In 1998, Chambers won the British Comedy Award (BCA) for Best Actress for her performance, having been nominated for a BCA previously for her portrayal of Alice in 1995.

Chambers voiced the character of "Belle Stickleback" in two series of the animated television programme Pond Life (1996 and 2000) and took the role of Helen Yardley in the TV series How Do You Want Me? (1998) and appeared in the film Notting Hill (1999), as Honey, the younger sister of Hugh Grant's character.

She was cast as Martha Thompson in Take a Girl Like You (2000), a made-for-television drama based on the Kingsley Amis novel and a remake of the 1970 film. Chambers worked as a voice performer in the animated made-for-television film The Wind in the Willows (1995) and provided the voice of Spotty for two episodes in the CBeebies series Little Robots (2003).

In 2002, Chambers toured with the Michael Frayn play, Benefactors, where she starred opposite Neil Pearson.

At the age of 43, Chambers essentially withdrew from public life after making her final acting appearance in a 2007 special Comic Relief episode of The Vicar of Dibley.

== Personal life, illness and death ==
Chambers was married to fellow actor Ian M. Dunn. Before their marriage, she lodged with Ian McKellen, whom she regarded as "a sort of father figure". She had a chronic allergy to animals as well as asthma.

Chambers died of a heart attack on 21 February 2018, aged 53.

On 26 February 2018 BBC One broadcast The Vicar of Dibley January 1998 episode "Love and Marriage" in Chambers' memory. On 11 March 2018 (on what would have been Chambers' 54th birthday), the Gold channel hosted a The Vicar of Dibley day in her memory.

== Tributes ==
In December 2020, in a series of short 'lockdown' episodes of The Vicar of Dibley, Chambers' character Alice was written out of the sitcom, it being revealed that the character had died. The final lockdown episode ended with a tribute just before the closing credits reading, "In loving memory of Liz, John, Emma and Roger", paying tribute to her and three other deceased Dibley cast members (Liz Smith, John Bluthal and Roger Lloyd-Pack).

In 2025, Chambers appeared on two British postage stamps issued as part of a special set by Royal Mail, which commemorated the series The Vicar of Dibley.

== Filmography ==
Year	Title	Role	Notes
1988	The Rainbow	Margaret	2 episodes
1990	The Bill	Marie Summers	2 episodes
1994	Martin Chuzzlewit	Charity Pecksniff	Regular role, 6 episodes
1994–2007	The Vicar of Dibley	Alice Tinker	Series regular, 20 episodes, (final appearance)
1995	The Wind in the Willows	Jailer's daughter	Voice, television film
1996	Drop the Dead Donkey	Carol	Episode: "What Are Friends For?"
1996	Pond Life	Belle	Voice, Series regular
1998–1999	How Do You Want Me?	Helen Yardley	Regular role, 11 episodes
1999	Notting Hill	Honey Thacker	
1999	The Clandestine Marriage	Betsy	
1999	The Comedy Trail: A Shaggy Dog Story	Alice Tinker	TV special
2000	Take a Girl Like You	Martha Thompson	3 episodes
2003	Little Robots	Spotty	Voice, 2 episodes
