= Gareth Carrivick =

Director (b. 1957, d. 2010)

Gareth Andrew Carrivick
- Born: 16 November 1957
- Died: 16 March 2010 (aged 52)
- Occupation: Television director

Gareth Andrew Carrivick (16 November 1957 – 16 March 2010) was a British director who was known for his involvement in productions such as FAQ About Time Travel and The Big Impression. He died of leukemia in 2010.

== Filmography ==
=== Film ===
Year	Title	Role	Notes
2004	The Bunk Bed Boys	Director	
2007	The Ornate Johnsons' Edwardian Spectacular	Director	
2009	Frequently Asked Questions About Time Travel	Director	Last film

=== Television ===
Year	Title	Role	Notes
1988–1996	French and Saunders	Production manager	13 episodes
1995	Bottom	Production manager	6 episodes
1995	A Bit of Fry and Laurie	Production manager	7 episodes
1995–1996	Absolutely Fabulous	Production manager	8 episodes
1997	Pilgrim's Rest	Director	5 episodes
2000	Two Pints of Lager and a Packet of Crisps	Director	-
2002	Dave Gorman's Important Astrology Experiment	Director	6 episodes
2004–05	The Smoking Room	Director	16 episodes
