= Gary Waldhorn =

English actor and comedian (1943–2022)

- Born: Gary Peter Waldhorn; 3 July 1943; Paddington, London, England
- Died: 10 January 2022 (aged 78)
- Occupation: Actor
- Years active: 1969–2013
- Known for: Vicar of Dibley; Brush Strokes
- Spouse: Christie Dickason (m. 1967)
- Children: 1

Gary Peter Waldhorn (3 July 1943 – 10 January 2022) was an English actor and comedian known for his roles in British television and theatre. He is particularly remembered for his work in the main casts of several British sitcoms. Notable roles and characters played by him included Councillor David Horton in The Vicar of Dibley and Lionel Bainbridge in Brush Strokes.

== Early life ==
Waldhorn was born in London on 3 July 1943 to Liselotte (née Popper) and Siegfried Waldhorn. His parents were Austrian Jews. He studied acting at the Yale School of Drama (graduated 1967) where he notably performed in new works written by playwright Lillian Hellman in 1966. While at Yale he met fellow student Christie Dickason, daughter of Indiana University academic David Howard Dickason, who became his wife and an active theatre director and choreographer in London and later a published playwright and novelist.

Waldhorn is known for his work in West End theatre productions and for his collaborations with the Royal Shakespeare Company. In 1972 he toured Australia and New Zealand in Harry M. Miller's production of Sleuth playing opposite Richard Todd.

== Career ==
Apart from appearing in The Vicar of Dibley, Waldhorn also made many television appearances from the 1970s including Softly, Softly, The Sweeney, Space: 1999, The New Avengers, Brideshead Revisited, The Professionals, Minder, Robin of Sherwood, Rumpole of the Bailey, The Bill, Heartbeat, Gallowglass and Lovejoy. He also played Lionel Bainbridge in the first three series of Brush Strokes before the character was written out, and Richard Beamish in the first series of All at No 20.

He also starred as Ralph Apsoland in the 1993 miniseries Gallowglass. His other notable television credits include several recurring roles: Caulaincourt in the mini-series Napoleon and Love, Greville in The Top Secret Life of Edgar Briggs, Henry Channon in Edward & Mrs. Simpson, Teddy Lupus in Enemy at the Door, John Fearnley in Moving, Gordon Lochhead in Campaign, Cllr. Alec Radcliffe in The Chief, Sergeant Bob Pulver in Lovejoy, and Cmdre. Forrest in Longitude. His film credits include the roles of Harlich in Zeppelin, Max in Sir Henry at Rawlinson End, Hauptmann Rainer Mueller in Escape to Victory, and Tornado in The Chain. On stage he was particularly active with the Royal Shakespeare Company.

== Personal life and death ==
Waldhorn was a patron of Malawi Dream, a British registered charity working to help the people of Malawi in Africa.

He married Christie Dickason on 2 April 1967; the marriage produced one child.

Waldhorn died on 10 January 2022, aged 78.

=== Tributes ===
In 2025, Waldhorn appeared on a British postage stamp issued as part of a special set by Royal Mail, which commemorated the series The Vicar of Dibley.

== Selected filmography ==
=== Television ===
Year	Film	Role	Notes	Reference
1969	Take Three Girls	Roger	1 episode	
1970–1974	Softly, Softly: Task Force	Bruton/James/Watson	3 episodes	
1970	Armchair Theatre	TV reporter	1 episode	
1971	Scene	Mr. Collett	1 episode	
1972	The Lotus Eaters	Nat	1 episode	
1972	Man at the Top	Television Instructor	1 episode	
1973	Jack the Ripper	William H. Druitt	1 episode	
1973	Crown Court	Trevor Sanderson	1 episode	
1974	Napoleon and Love	Caulaincourt	2 episodes	
1974	The Top Secret Life of Edgar Briggs	Greville	2 episodes	
1975	Doctor on the Go	Mike Sherman	1 episode	
1975	Whodunnit?	Sergeant Channing	1 episode	
1975	The Sweeney	Alan Fowler	1 episode	
1976	Space: 1999	Winters	1 episode	
1976	Hadleigh	Werner Von Hermsdorff	1 episode	
1976	Maggie and Her	Roger	1 episode	
1976	The New Avengers	Roach	1 episode	
1977	Seven Faces of Women	Harry	1 episode	
1978	Enemy at the Door	Teddy Lupus	2 episodes	
1978	The Professionals	Turner	1 episode	
1978	Return of the Saint	Anonymous	1 episode	
1978	Edward & Mrs. Simpson	Chips Channon	3 episodes	
1980	A Sharp Intake of Breath	Denis	1 episode	
1980	The Gentle Touch	Tom Scott	1 episode	
1980	Hammer House of Horror	Dr. Bacharach	1 episode	
1981	ITV Playhouse	Curtis Howard	1 episode	
1981	The Spoils of War	Neville Bryant	1 episode	
1981	Brideshead Revisited	Major Wilson	1 episode	
1982	Minder	Alex Rowan	1 episode	
1982	Alexa	Robert	2 episodes	
1982	Harry's Game	Commissioner of Police	1 episode	
1982	Outside Edge	Dennis	Television film	
1983	Perfect Shadows	Hank	Television film	
1983	All for Love	Michael Pallister	1 episode	
1983	The Winner	Bill Stafford	Television film	
1984	Robin of Sherwood	Hubert Walter	1 episode	
1984	Squaring the Circle	Jagielski	Television film	
1984	Hammer House of Mystery and Suspense	Inspector Crane	1 episode	
1984	The Prisoner of Zenda	Smithers	1 episode	
1985	Moving	John Fearnley	2 episodes	
1985	Mr. Palfrey of Westminster	Garforth	1 episode	
1985	Drummonds	Mr. Steiner	1 episode	
1985	Mrs. Capper' Birthday	Jack	Television film	
1986	All at No 20	Richard Beamish	6 episodes	
1986	Love and Marriage	Geoffrey Sherratt	1 episode	
1986	Screen Two	Boris/Deferre	2 episodes	
1986–1991	Brush Strokes	Lionel Bainbridge	26 episodes	
1987	After Pilkington	Boris	1 episode	
1988	Campaign	Gordon Lochhead	6 episodes	
1989	ScreenPlay	Dr. Buckman	1 episode	
1989	The Return of Shelley	Sir Clive Bastin	1 episode	
1990	Haggard	The Preacher	1 episode	
1990	Missing Persons	Bernard Shawcross	Television film	
1991	The Chief	Cllr. Alec Radcliffe	4 episodes	
1991	Titmuss Regained	Carus Agnew, QC	1 episode	
1991	Rumpole of the Bailey	Dr. Cogger	1 episode	
1993	Gallowglass	Ralph Apsoland	3 episodes	
1993	Comedy Playhouse	Mr. Hogson	1 episode	
1993–1994	Lovejoy	Detective Sergeant Bob Pulver	3 episodes	
1994–2007	The Vicar of Dibley	David Horton	20 episodes	
1996	Paul Merton in Galton and Simpson's...	Doctor/Company Director	2 episodes	
1996–1998	French and Saunders	Bruce Ismay/Gary	2 episodes	
1996	Heartbeat	Joss Harrop	1 episode	
1998	The Bill	Kenny Roberts	1 episode	
1998	Loved by You	Harold Conway	1 episode	
2000	Longitude	Commodore Forrest	Television film	
2008	Hotel Babylon	Donald Stern	1 episode	

=== Films ===
- Zeppelin (1971) – Harlich
- Hanover Street (1979) – 2nd German Clerk
- Dirty Money (1979) – Ministry Man
- Sir Henry at Rawlinson End (1980) – Max
- Escape to Victory (1981) – Hauptmann Rainer Mueller
- The Chain (1984) – Tornado

=== Radio ===
- "The Carrara Cherub", BBC Radio 4, Saturday Night Theatre, 21 August 1982 – Ray Damon (Private Detective)
- An Actor's Life For Me, BBC Radio 2, 20 January 1989–9 February 1993, 19 episodes – Desmond Shaw
- Elastic Planet, BBC Radio 4, 17 March 1995, 1 episode – Ensemble Actor
- Tomorrow, Today!, BBC Radio 4, 28 January–3 March 2008, 3 episodes – Sir Angus McNairn
