= Laura Doddington =

English actress (born 1981)

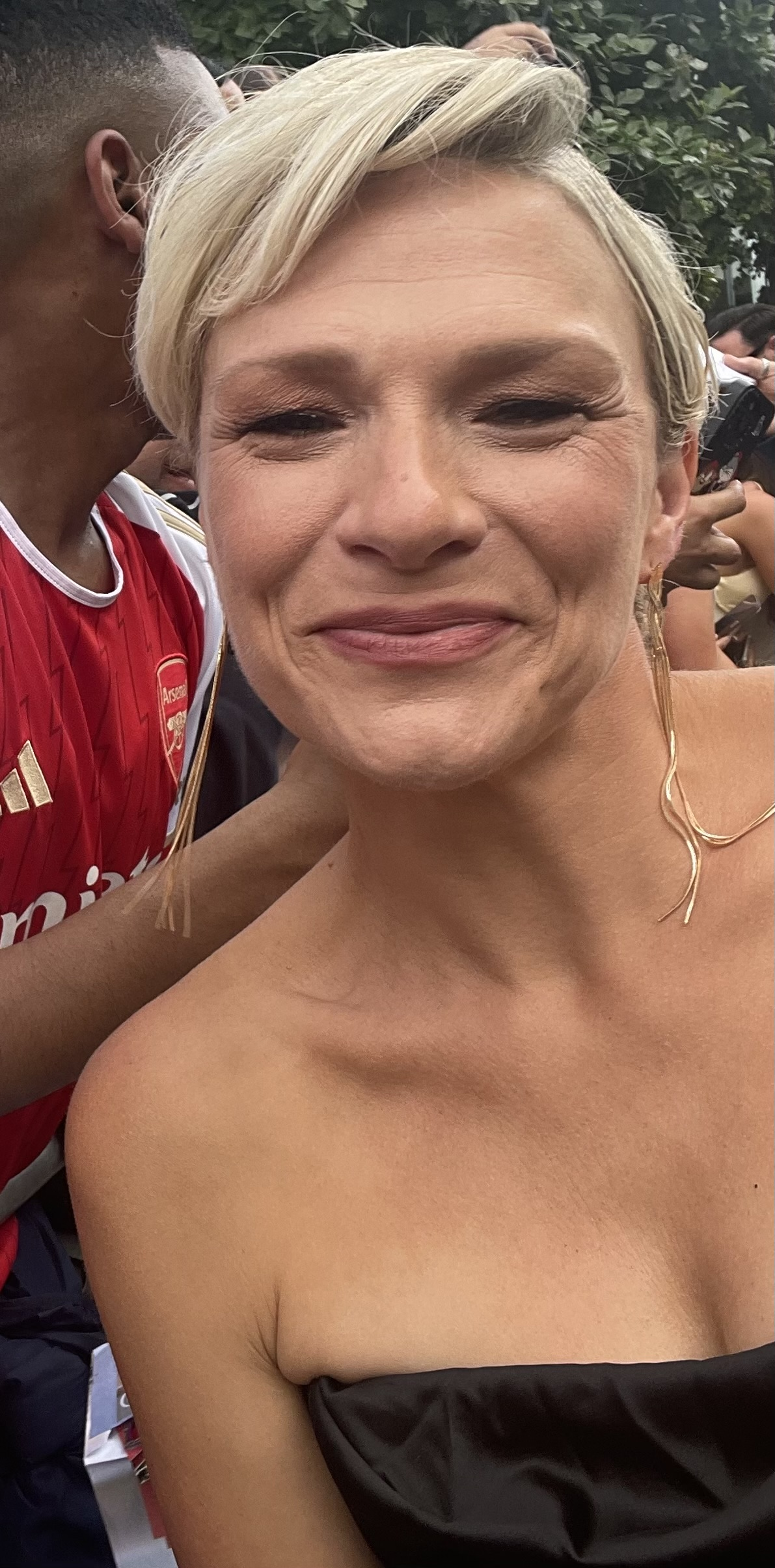
- Doddington in 2025
- Born: Laura May Doddington; 2 January 1981 (age 45); Cambridge, England
- Occupation: Actress
- Years active: 2004–present
- Television: Doctors; EastEnders
- Children: 1

Laura May Doddington (born 2 January 1981) is an English actress, known for portraying the role of Nicola Mitchell in the BBC soap opera EastEnders since 2024. Her other roles include her portrayal of Zara in several of the Doctor Who audio productions, as well as her appearances in medical dramas such as Doctors, Casualty and Holby City. She has also provided voices for numerous video games including Age of Empires IV and Assassin's Creed Valhalla and has appeared extensively in various theatre productions in a stage career spanning two decades.

== Early life and education ==
Laura May Doddington was born on 2 January 1981 in Cambridge, England. Doddington studied at Edinburgh’s Queen Margaret University School of Drama between 1999 and 2002, where she obtained a BA degree in acting.

== Career ==
In 2004, Doddington made her stage debut in the plays I Ought to Be in Pictures, and went on to appear in numerous other plays at the Stephen Joseph Theatre over the next two years, which included Miranda's Magic Mirror (2004), Her Slightest Touch (2004), For Starters (2004), Miss Yesterday (2004), Time and Time Again (2005), Improbable Fiction (2005–2006), Caution Trousers (2005) and The Champion of Paribanou (2006). She subsequently began appearing in further stage productions for various theatre companies.

Doddington's television debut was in the final two episodes of Prime Suspect in October 2006. She appeared in the BBC medical soap opera Doctors on four separate occasions as various characters. She has appeared in numerous Doctor Who audio productions, primarily as the character Zara, which she first played in the audio adaptations Doctor Who: The Companion Chronicles and Doctor Who: The Monthly Adventures in 2009. The same year she appeared as Trudy Parks in Man of the Moment at the Royal & Derngate theatre, before appearing in an episode of the BBC soap opera EastEnders as Barbara, a woman leading an antenatal class attended by Masood Ahmed (Nitin Ganatra) and Zainab Masood (Nina Wadia). She also played Julia Sindall in an episode of The Bill. Between 2010 and 2011, Doddington starred as Poopay in Communicating Doors at the Stephen Joseph Theatre. In 2014, she appeared in an episode of Casualty as Tina Connolly. In 2015, she appeared in Educating Rita at The Mill at Sonning and in Boeing-Boeing at the Oldham Coliseum Theatre.

In 2019, Doddington appeared in an episode of Holby City as Abbey Ealy. In 2022, she appeared in the Sky Max sci-fi series The Midwich Cuckoos as DS Mayes. In 2023, she appeared in the stage plays Yours Unfaithfully and Owners at Jermyn Street Theatre, portraying the characters of Anne Meredith and Marion, respectively. In 2024, Doddington returned to EastEnders and was cast in the regular role of Nicola Mitchell. Her character was introduced as the ex-wife of Teddy Mitchell (Roland Manookian) and mother of Harry (Elijah Holloway) and Barney Mitchell (Lewis Bridgeman).

== Filmography ==
=== Film and television ===
Year	Title	Role	Notes	Ref.
2006	Prime Suspect	DC Wood	2 episodes	
2008	Doctors	Clare Porter	Episode: "Life's a Beach"	
2009	The Bill	Julia Sindall	Episode: "Got You Wrong"	
2009	EastEnders	Barbara	1 episode	
2012	Doctors	Carly Denby	Episode: "Judgement Day"	
2014	Casualty	Tina Connolly	Episode: "Only the Lonely"	
2017	People Just Do Nothing	Customer	Episode: "Bosses"	
2019	Holby City	Abbey Ealy	Episode: "North and South"	
2019	Doctors	Marta Coval	Episode: "B Flat"	
2021	Doctors	Mira Hyde	Episode: "The Missing Piece"	
2022	The Midwich Cuckoos	DS Mayes	4 episodes	
2024	Promise	—N/a	Short film	
2024–present	EastEnders	Nicola Mitchell	Regular role	
2025	The Death of Bunny Munro	Woman	1 episode	

=== Video games ===
Year	Title	Role	Ref.
2015	The Witcher 3: Wild Hunt	Orianna	
2018	Ni no Kuni II: Revenant Kingdom	—N/a	
2020	Assassin's Creed Valhalla	—N/a	
2021	Age of Empires IV	Villager Female	
2023	Warhammer Age of Sigmar: Realms of Ruin	Strylka / Magister	
2024	Unknown 9: Awakening	—N/a	

=== Audio ===
Year	Title	Role	Notes	Ref.
2009	Doctor Who: The Companion Chronicles	Zara	1 episode	
2009	Doctor Who: The Monthly Adventures	Zara	2 episodes	
2010–2017	Graceless	Zara	4 series	
2014	The Confessions of Dorian Gray	The Woman in Blue / Sally	2 episodes	
2015	Gallifrey	Vale Endrogan	Episode: "Intervention Earth"	
2015	The Worlds of Big Finish	Zara	Episode: "The Archive"	
2016	Torchwood: Monthly Range	The Graces	Episode: "Ghost Mission"	
2016	Doctor Who: The New Adventures of Bernice Summerfield	Idratz	Episode: "The Very Dark Thing"	
2016	The Torchwood Archive	Delilah	Podcast series	
2017	The War Master	Lady Sutlumu / Second Official	2 episodes	
2020	Torchwood: The Sins of Captain John	Baroness Ha-ha / Frances, Duchess of Winchester	Episode: "Ghost Mission"	
2020	Doctor Who: Wicked Sisters	Zara	Podcast series	

== Stage ==
Year	Title	Role	Venue	Ref.
2004	I Ought to Be in Pictures	Libby	Stephen Joseph Theatre	
2004	Miranda's Magic Mirror	Miranda	Stephen Joseph Theatre	
2004	Her Slightest Touch	Girl	Stephen Joseph Theatre	
2004	For Starters	Daisy	Stephen Joseph Theatre	
2004	Miss Yesterday	Tammy Laidlaw	Stephen Joseph Theatre	
2005	Time and Time Again	Joan	Stephen Joseph Theatre	
2005–2006	Improbable Fiction	Ilsa	Stephen Joseph Theatre	
2005	Caution Trousers	Debs	Stephen Joseph Theatre	
2006	The Champion of Paribanou	Murganah	Stephen Joseph Theatre	
2006	Oleanna	Carol	New Vic Theatre	
2007	Noises Off	Poppy Norton-Taylor	Everyman Theatre, Liverpool	
2007	Time of My Life	Stephanie	Royal & Derngate	
2008	On a Shout	Jo / Louise / Pam	Hull Truck Theatre	
2008	Wives as They Were and Maids as They Are	Maria	Theatre Royal, Bury St Edmunds	
2009	Private Fears in Public Places	Imogen	Royal & Derngate	
2009	Man of the Moment	Trudy Parks	Royal & Derngate	
2009	Cinderella	Fairy Godmother	Watford Palace Theatre	
2010	Alphabetical Order	Lesley	New Vic Theatre	
2010–2011	Life of Riley	Tamsin	Stephen Joseph Theatre	
2010–2011	Communicating Doors	Poopay	Stephen Joseph Theatre	
2011	Jack and the Beanstalk	Fortuna / Spatula	Watford Palace Theatre	
2012	Absurd Person Singular	Jane Hopcroft	Stephen Joseph Theatre	
2012–2013	Surprises	Sylvia / Zandy	Stephen Joseph Theatre	
2013	Mansfield Park	Mary	Theatre Royal, Bury St Edmunds	
2014	Bedroom Farce	Susannah	Oldham Coliseum Theatre	
2015	Educating Rita	Rita	The Mill at Sonning	
2015	Boeing-Boeing	Gloria	Oldham Coliseum Theatre	
2016	Last of the Red Hot Lovers	Rita	The Mill at Sonning	
2022	The Birds and the Bees	Sarah	New Wolsey Theatre	
2023	They Don't Pay? We Won't Pay!	Anthea	Mercury Theatre, Colchester	
2023	Yours Unfaithfully	Anne Meredith	Jermyn Street Theatre	
2023	Owners	Marion	Jermyn Street Theatre	

== Awards and nominations ==
Year	Award	Category	Work	Result	Ref(s)
2025	British Soap Awards	Best Newcomer	EastEnders	Nominated	
2025	Inside Soap Awards	Best Newcomer	EastEnders	Won	
