= Improbable Fiction =

2005 play by Alan Ayckbourn

- Original language: English
- Written by: Alan Ayckbourn
- Characters: Arnold; Grace; Jess; Vivi; Brevis; Clem; Ilsa
- Subject: Writers' imaginations
- Genre: Comedy
- Setting: Writers' circle meeting in Arnold's living room

Premiere
- Date: 31 May 2005
- Place: Stephen Joseph Theatre, Scarborough
- Official website

Improbable Fiction is a 2005 play by British playwright Alan Ayckbourn. It is about a writers' circle, on the night the chairman, Arnold, seems to wander into the imaginations of the other writers.

== Background ==
Part of the inspiration for Improbable Fiction was reported to be a talk that Alan Ayckbourn once gave to a writers' circle, which he suspected was actually more of a social circle. The title was inspired by a quote from William Shakespeare's Twelfth Night:

"If this were played upon a stage now, I could condemn it as improbable fiction." – Twelfth Night, Act III, scene 4

If the immediately preceding adult play, Private Fears in Public Places was notable for being the bleakest Ayckbourn play for many years, Improbable Fiction was notable for being the lightest, because in the few years previously, even the comedies had serious themes to them. It has been observed that this play has similarities with Ayckbourn's earlier family plays The Boy Who Fell into a Book and, to a lesser extent, My Very Own Story. Whether there was an intentional adaptation of these plays is unclear, but this was repeated the following year with If I Were You (argued to be derived from The Jollies).

Whatever the reason for such a light play, it fitted in with the Stephen Joseph Theatre's 50th anniversary season, along with a revival of another Ayckbourn comedy, Time and Time Again.

== Characters ==
There are seven characters in the play. They are:

- Arnold, middle-aged chairman of the Writers' group and writer of instruction manuals
- Grace, mother of grown-up children, wants to write children's books
- Jess, a farmer, wants to write period romance novels
- Vivi, younger woman, busy writing detective novels
- Brevis, retired headmaster, still writing musicals
- Clem, young man, writing conspiracy theory science fiction
- Ilsa, carer for Arnold's mother during Writers' group meetings.

In the second act, all the characters start playing various parts from various stories, apart from a confused Arnold who carries on being himself, whatever role is thrust on him by the story.

== Setting ==
In contrast to Private Fears in Public Places and its 54 mini-scenes, Improbable Fiction used the single set of the living room in Arnold's house throughout the play, and one continuous scene, broken only by the interval. The first act almost entirely takes place during the Writers' Circle meeting. In the second act, however, the same room represents various houses in various stories in Victorian times, the 1930s, and the present day, with no set change other than changing the type of phone present on the dresser.

The play was performed in-the-round for its original run at the Stephen Joseph Theatre in 2005. In the 2006 tour, it was adapted for the proscenium.

== Synopsis ==
The play begins with Arnold anxiously setting up the chairs for a writers' circle meeting. First to arrive is Ilsa, a young girl whom Arnold hires to serve the tea. Ilsa also looks after Arnold's live-in bed-ridden mother, who periodically demands attention by banging a stick on the upstairs floor. She holds Arnold and the rest of the group in awe on the grounds that they are all writers, although Arnold himself, the only member of the group to have had something published, only writes instruction leaflets.

When the rest of the group arrive, they all, over the first act, reveal what they are working on. Grace shows her illustrations for her children's story "Doblin the Goblin" (with friend Sid the Squirrel), Jess tells her of her vision for her period romance, Vivi explains how her latest detective novel is darker than the last three, Brevis plays a (somewhat tuneless) song "There's Light at the End of the Tunnel" from his musical adaptation of The Pilgrim's Progress, and Clem reads out an extract from his science fiction story (or, as Clem sees it, "science fact", with names changed to protect identities).

All the writers have obvious weaknesses with their writing. Grace's children have long since grown up and her ideas would be confusing to the age this kind of story is aimed at. Jess never manages to start writing, whilst Vivi is clearly over-writing, and her description of the detective's smitten sidekick is obviously modelled on her and her search for the right man. Brevis's long list of successfully performed musicals can be attributed to the fact that he was a teacher at a school, and now that he is retired he is stuck. And Clem gets angry that no-one can follow his incomprehensible plot, and his persistent mispronunciation of words (such as "invulshable" instead of "invincible") drives Brevis up the wall.

There is not much sign of the writers helping each other that much, and the group is still reeling from last week's visiting writer (if you can count someone who is only publicised on the internet as a writer), whose summary, in Arnold's words, was that "You should get the F-word on with it" (to which Brevis points out he finished with "you bunch of wankers.") When a nervous Ilsa enters and serves the tea painfully slowly, the rest of the group start making wild speculation about her.

With the meeting over, the five writers go home, leaving just Ilsa, waiting for her boyfriend to pick her up on his motorbike. Suddenly, the lights go out, and Arnold sees Ilsa, in Victorian dress, walk towards him with a candle and a knife. The other five writers also surround him in Victorian dress. Ilsa screams, Arnold cries "Good Gracious!" and the first act ends.

With the second act starting exactly where the first one left off, Arnold suddenly hears Jess narrating the story, somewhat in the style of Jane Austen or the Brontë sisters. Ilsa, it seems, has turned into an heiress who has seen some sort of ghost. But before this mystery can be solved, the room changes into that of a 1930s house, and a detective (Clem) and his assistant (Vivi, behaving very similar to the real Vivi) question Arnold about the murder of his wife, rather like a Poirot mystery. And then, before this is solved, Arnold finds himself confronted by a group of agents investigating the alien abduction of his mother-in-law (this time, with striking similarity to The X Files, Alien or The Matrix), with the leader (Brevis), mispronouncing all the long words exactly how Clem would want them.

As Arnold flits back and forth through the stories, the first two mysteries are solved relatively easily. The ghost that the heiress/Ilsa saw, was, of course, just a model created by her scheming cousin (Clem) so that she could be declared insane and he could get the inheritance, but he gets rumbled. And so (or, as Jess narrates "And so, dear reader ...") this story ends. The murder's alibi in the 1930s is exposed when it is pointed out she did not have her glasses at the time, but not before the detective comes across a strange instruction manual in his pocket. Making the first kind comment ever to his sidekick (and Vivi says "Isn't he wonderful!") he leaves Arnold with the maid/Ilsa, who now seems to be his mistress. Ilsa advances on a bemused Arnold, but before she can have her way with him, he is back in the sci-fi story.

The agents capture an alien pod and use it as trade. Whilst waiting, Brevis almost starts playing a song he wrote on the piano, but gets interrupted by the release of the captive. Suddenly, the alien pod starts to open to reveal ... Doblin the Goblin (Ilsa). A much more tuneful version of "There's Light at the End of the Tunnel" starts playing, Doblin sails down the river (the open alien pod now serving as Doblin's walnut-cum-boat), Sid the Squirrel follows, with all the rest in tow.

And so Arnold is left alone again. He says "It's nice to finish with a song". The real Ilsa joins him – evidently, whilst he spent an hour in other people's imaginations, for her it was just a moment in another room. It is clear that Arnold and Ilsa have a genuine friendship. Then, after Ilsa leaves, to prove it is back to reality, Arnold's mother bangs on the ceiling once more. He goes upstairs saying "It was a quiet evening really. Nothing unusual ..."

== Productions ==
The original production at the Stephen Joseph Theatre had its first performance on 26 May 2005, and an opening night on 31 May 2005 featuring the following cast:

- Arnold: John Branwell
- Grace: Eileen Battye
- Jess: Becky Hindley
- Vivi: Clare Swinburne
- Brevis: Terence Booth
- Clem: Giles New
- Ilsa: Laura Doddington

The production team were:

- Director – Alan Ayckbourn
- Design – Roger Glossop
- Lighting – James Farncombe
- Costumes – Pip Leckenby
- Music – John Pattison

The production toured in 2006 with the same cast, except that Stuart Fox replaced Giles New as Clem. London, once again, was not included in the tour.

Since the Stephen Joseph production, there have been three further productions by other theatre companies, in Outer London, Hastings, Crawley and Cheltenham.

== Critical reviews ==
Reviews of the production were divided, generally either broadly positive or broadly negative, with little in between. Much of the difference of opinion was down to what reviewers made of the change between the first and second acts.

Amongst the positive reviews, Alfred Hickling of The Guardian wrote "... the second half provides a theatrical transformation of the magnitude only Ayckbourn can dream of." Charles Hutchinson of the Yorkshire Evening Press wrote: "Ayckbourn moves into the speeding, fantastical dimensions of his Christmas family shows, as stories in the style of each writer overlap, giving Ayckbourn the chance to send up Jane Austen, Dorothy L Sayers and The Matrix."

However, the same second act that earned praise from some critics was criticised by Sam Marlowe, saying "The problem is that this parade of comic cardboard cut-outs is impossible to care about, so it's not long before it falls flat," whilst arguing the earlier scenes worked better. Charles Spencer, reviewing the show on its tour at Guildford, was harsher, suggesting this play was evidence of Ayckbourn's decline. He wrote: "Ultimately, it's the laziness that bothers me most about latter-day Ayckbourn. You don't feel he truly cares about his characters any more: indeed, at times he can't be bothered to get inside their heads at all."

It was suggested that the reviews were generally better for the Scarborough production in the context of its 50th anniversary season, whilst expectations on the tour were for something deeper. Nonetheless, with three professional productions in the three years after the tour ended, Improbable Fiction has maintained a stage life outside of its original run.

The play had its American premiere on 1 May 2009, at the Black River Playhouse, Chester, New Jersey, directed by Michael T. Mooney.
