= My Wonderful Day =

Play written by Alan Ayckbourn

- Written by: Alan Ayckbourn
- Characters: Winnie; Laverne; Kevin; Tiffany; Josh; Paula
- Original language: English
- Subject: Child's view of affairs, family breakdown
- Genre: Comedy

Premiere
- Date premiered: 13 October 2009
- Place premiered: Stephen Joseph Theatre, Scarborough
- Official website

My Wonderful Day is a 2009 play by Alan Ayckbourn. It is about a nine-year-old girl, Winnie, who has an essay to write about her day, and records the shenanigans of grown-ups around her.

This was the first Ayckbourn play to feature parts written specifically for black actors, and the first "adult" Ayckbourn play to feature a child as the main character.

== Background ==
When Alan Ayckbourn announced his retirement as artistic director of the Stephen Joseph Theatre in early 2009, it was agreed with his successor, Chris Monks, that he would continue to première new works at the theatre, and also direct revivals of his plays. The first play directed at Scarborough under this arrangement was How the Other Half Loves, but it was not until October that year that his first new play was performed, with Ayckbourn technically working as a freelance writer and director under commission.

The character of Winnie was first developed in an early draft of another Ayckbourn play, Life of Riley, where it was intended that she would receive French tuition from another character. Winnie's age changed from 11 to 9, her mother was renamed from Glynis to Laverne, but the French tuition formed an important plot element of this play. (The final version of Life of Riley was only written and performed in the year after My Wonderful Day, with Winnie dropped from the story.) My Wonderful Day was originally titled Winnie's Wonderful Day, and this title became public after it was mentioned in the programmes for the Ayckbourn at 70 season at the Royal and Derngate in Northampton. However, it was later renamed after concerns the play might otherwise be mistaken for a family play.

This play was heavily based on the perspective of a child, described by Ayckbourn as a "small recording machine" – in this case, made more interesting by the fact that the adults ignore her and give away far too much information. He also acknowledged his own childhood was heavily shaped by observing the various adult women in his man-free world (whilst also suggesting this is how he writes for women.) However, Michael Billington went further and suggested that Winnie is treated as invisible not only because she is a child, but also because she is black.

This play was the first Ayckbourn play to have a part written specifically for a black actors (Ayesha Antoine and Petra Letang), but not the first one to feature a black actor in the original production – Drowning on Dry Land, with Billie Claire-Wright as Gale. It was also the first where the child played a lead role in a play for an adult audience, with children in previous plays (other than family plays) being either cameos or off-stage characters.

== Characters ==
There are six characters in the play:

- Winnie (Winnoa) Barnstairs: Central character, on stage throughout the play. Nine-year-old black girl whose essay captures the disastrous events of the day.
- Laverne Barnstairs: Winnie's mother, cleaner, estranged from husband, pregnant with second child, half-heartedly intending to return to Martinique
- Kevin Tate (the man): Famous TV personality, owner of the home Laverne is cleaning, with a thinly veiled dislike of children
- Tiffany (the secretary): Supposedly Kevin's secretary, actually his mistress, baby-talks to Winnie
- Josh (the friend): Friend of Kevin's, with no idea how to relate to either Winnie or his own children
- Paula Tate (the wife): Semi-estranged wife of Kevin, engaging in dastardly revenge for her husband's infidelity

Although the lead character is a child, the actress who played her in the première, Ayesha Antoine, was aged 28 at the time.

== Setting ==
The play runs for a continuous 1 hour 45 minutes without an interval, taking place over the course of a single day. It mostly takes place in the house of Kevin, in the living room, office and kitchen (with a final scene by a hospital bed). The three rooms were represented on stage by three mini-sets, and the corridors between the three sets were represented by lights on the floor, with the actors walking to the stage edge, then turning round and walking back. Throughout the play, all that is seen and heard is equivalent to what Winnie sees and hears (and, it is implied, what goes into her essay).

The Stephen Joseph Theatre production originally staged this production in the round, with the rest of the performances on the tour re-staged for the proscenium.

== Synopsis ==
Laverne enters Kevin's house, with Winnie following. The three walk throughout the house, Kevin looking for his wife Paula, and Laverne talking over him. Winnie, sick and off school for the day, is allowed to stay whilst her mother does the cleaning. Laverne reminds Winnie that Tuesday is "French Day", when the two of them only speak in French – the idea being that after Laverne's second child, Jericho Alexander Samson, is born, the three of them will start a new life in Martinique, birthplace of Laverne's parents.

After exchanging a few phrases in French (Laverne's French is considerably worse than her daughter's), Laverne leaves Winnie to write her school essay. Titled "My Wonderful Day", it must record everything that happens in the day. Winnie shortly hears Kevin on the phone discussing last night's party with his friend, Josh, using most unsuitable language, and this she diligently adds. Then Tiffany, Kevin's young and skinny secretary arrives. She enthusiastically talks to her like a toddler, and replies in French. Laverne explains "French Day" and when she mentions that her husband is gone, Tiffany as asks if he was young, and Laverne replies "She was".

Kevin gets drawn into another phone call, this time an argument with Paula, so Tiffany ushers Winnie into the office. Unsure what to say, Tiffany first talks about her boarding school and then excitedly describes Kevin's television fame, before suggesting they watch "Fantacity", a promotional DVD for a business/retail park fronted by Kevin and edited by Tiffany. Tiffany gazes adoringly, mouthing his words, whilst Winnie gets bored and balances a pencil of her head. Tiffany has just pointed herself out when the DVD is interrupted by Paula, who describes Tiffany as the fat one by the pool and say that she and Kevin have been "fucking each other's brains out".

A distraught Tiffany (upset mainly for being called fat) takes Winnie away into the kitchen and gets Kevin. Laverne promises to read Winnie's essay after work and keep cleaning. Josh then arrives, summoned by Kevin's emergency. Both, mistakenly believing Winnie only speaks French (even with an English-speaking mother), discuss the messy details in front of her. Paula's appearance is on the whole batch of DVDs – something she is adept at, having previously won a BAFTA for editing. With both men having defunct marriages, they agree that Paula is genetically inclined to violence.

Josh is left alone with Winnie. Worse for wear, he talks about his relationship with his teenage daughter, who he now barely sees. Assuming Winnie hasn't understood this, he dissolves into tears. Winnie, meanwhile, writes down everything Kevin and Josh said. Laverne then cries out in pain, having gone into labour early. In spite Laverne's reassurances she'll be all right, a worried Winnie suddenly gives her mother a hug.

Left alone for the afternoon, Kevin, Josh and Tiffany approach Winnie with exaggerated kindness. Kevin explains that they will look after her until her neighbour can collect her, but his patience swiftly wears thin when he discovers there is no lunch. Tiffany goes for sandwiches whilst a famished Josh tries to persuade Winnie to give him one of her biscuits, and when that fails, tries to pinch one only to be caught red-handed. Feigning interest in the book Winnie is reading, The Secret Garden, Winnie reads it aloud for him (one word at a time and stumbling over the hard ones), whilst Josh falls asleep. Tiffany leaves Josh his sandwich, which Winnie takes a bite from before putting it back in the package.

Driven from the kitchen by Josh's snoring, Winnie returns to the living room, sitting on the one part of the sofa not soaked when her mother's waters broke. Before her eyes, Kevin comforts Tiffany from the earlier insults, then they move on to pet names of "Big Bear" and "Ickle Tiffy" before heading for the bedroom. She continues writing until Paula arrives. Winnie speaks to her in French, and Paula responds likewise. She assumed Winnie has peed on the sofa before Winnie explains, whereupon Paula apologises for losing her temper, acknowledges it is her bad habit and promises not to do it again. She then takes Winnie on a hunt for Kevin, and instead finds Josh asleep in the kitchen. Josh, correctly guessing where Kevin has gone, tries to bluff Paula away from looking upstairs, but when Winnie says what happened in French and Josh asks what she said, a furious Paula say, "Enough".

Winnie sees Paula escort Tiffany outside, with Tiffany covered only in a bedsheet – which Paula retains after pushing her through the door. Ignoring Tiffany's pleas about the cold, Paula then return upstairs. Moments later, Josh helps a bleeding Kevin outside, Kevin having been hit of the head with Paula's BAFTA. Paula apologises again to Winnie for losing her temper twice, and then, leaving Winnie just enough time to finish her essay, before taking Winnie to the hospital.

In hospital, both Laverne and the newborn baby are fine. Paula leaves them, explains she need to attend to another patient with a head injury. Winnie almost persuades her mother not to call the baby Jericho, but when Laverne suggests naming it after Kevin, Winnie goes with Jericho. Then Winnie read out her essay. It goes into minute detail (including the state of Kevin's toenails, and her belief that her mother only says she wants to go to Martinique because she is unhappy about the separation).

Only the beginning of the essay is heard, because the closing music fades in. However, Laverne is seen sitting is in amazement, then snatching the essay off Winnie and reading the rest herself.

== Productions ==
The original production at the Stephen Joseph Theatre had its first performance on 8 October 2009, and an opening night on 13 October 2009, featuring the following cast:

- Winne – Ayesha Antoine
- Laverne – Petra Letang
- Kevin – Terence Booth
- Tiffany – Ruth Gibson
- Josh – Paul Kemp
- Paula – Alexandra Mathie

The production team were:

- Director – Alan Ayckbourn
- Design – Roger Glossop
- Lighting – Mick Hughes

After the run at the Stephen Joseph Theatre, the play immediately transferred to 59E59 Theater in New York. This was the third Ayckbourn play to transfer to Off-Broadway as part off the Brits Off Broadway festival (the first two being Private Fears in Public Places in 2005 and a revival of Intimate Exchanges in 2007), but the first to transfer to New York immediately after the original run in Scarborough.

The following year, the play returned to the UK for a tour of eight theatres. All the original cast took part throughout the US and UK performances.

== Critical reviews ==
The reviews of My Wonderful Day were almost unanimous in praise. Alfred Hickling for The Guardian, after commending Ayckbourn's ability to write part for little girls in general, acclaimed this play as Ayckbourn's furthest exploration into the pre-teen mind. Meanwhile, Jeremy Kingston for The Times wrote (in relation to Paula saying "Enough!") that "Ayckbourn can bring the house down with a single word", and also suggested "Winnie may grow up to write 73 perceptive comedies herself."

However, the most praise was reserved for Ayesha Antoine's performance as Winnie. Kevin Berry for The Stage particularly singled out her body language, from facial expressions to hunching over the table to swinging her legs.; whilst Alfred Hickling simply said Ayckbourn had struck gold. There was also praise for the effectiveness of the five-minute sequence where Winnie simply reads out The Secret Garden, with Claire Brennan for The Observer writing "In that moment, a transformation happens as magical as the most magnificent pantomime transformation anyone could ever imagine, even though, on the stage, nothing changes;" and Charles Hutchinson from The Press considered this another example of Ayckbourn's long history of risk-taking.

A minority of reviews were lukewarm, with Dominic Cavendish for The Daily Telegraph describing the play as "a perfectly decent but pretty forgettable comedy", and Ian Shuttleworth for the Financial Times commenting "It's not classic Ayckbourn, but there's certainly life in the old dog yet".

The reception in New York was also positive. Ben Brantley of The New York Times likening the play to What Masie Knew by Henry James. The play was nominated twice for the Drama Desk Awards: the play itself as Outstanding Play, and Ayesha Antoine as Outstanding Actress in a Play. However, Elisabeth Vincentelli for The New York Post considered the play "uneventful", only picking up at the end with Paula's entrance.
