= The Musical Jigsaw Play =

1994 family musical by Alan Ayckbourn and John Pattison

- Original language: English
- Written by: Alan Ayckbourn
- Characters: Nige; Sin; Edge; Wicky; Jetta
- Subject: interactive puzzle solving

Premiere
- Date: 1 December 1994
- Place: Stephen Joseph Theatre (Westwood site), Scarborough
- Official website

The Musical Jigsaw Play is a 1994 family musical by Alan Ayckbourn and John Pattison. It is set in a strange word where bad pop groups go, and the play involves help from the audience in solving puzzles to escape. Unlike most Ayckbourn plays, this play was only produced once, largely due to the technical demands and lack of suitability for end-stage theaters.
