= Sisterly Feelings =

1979 play by Alan Ayckbourn

- Written by: Alan Ayckbourn
- Characters: Ralph; Abigail; Dorcas; Melvyn; Len; Rita; Patrick; Brenda; Simon; Stafford; Murphy
- Original language: English
- Subject: Consequences of decisions
- Setting: Various outdoor scenes

Premiere
- Date premiered: 10 January 1979
- Place premiered: Stephen Joseph Theatre (Westwood site), Scarborough
- Official website

Sisterly Feelings is a 1979 play by British playwright Alan Ayckbourn. It is the first of Alan Ayckbourn's plays to have alternate plotlines depending on decisions made during the plays (the later two plays of this kind being Intimate Exchanges and It Could Be Any One Of Us). In this play, two sisters, Abigail and Dorcas, compete for the attention of their brother's fiancée's brother, Simon, and whoever ends up with him depends on a toss of coin for scene two, and a decision made by the actors in scene three.
