= If I Were You =

If I Were You may refer to:

== Literature ==
- If I Were You (Wodehouse novel), a 1931 novel by P.G. Wodehouse
- If I Were You (Hubbard novel), a 1940 novel by L. Ron Hubbard
- If I Were You (Si j'étais vous...), a 1947 novel by Julien Green

== Music ==
- "If I Were You", a 1930s song by Bob Emmerich with lyrics by Buddy Bernier, recorded by Billie Holiday, Fats Waller, Tommy Dorsey a.o.
- "If I Were You", a 1981 song by Lulu from Lulu
- "If I Were You", a 1985 song by Stevie Nicks from Rock a Little
- "If I Were You", a 1992 song by Celine Dion from Celine Dion
- "If I Were You", a 1993 song by Straitjacket Fits from Blow
- "If I Were You" (Collin Raye song), a 1994 song by Collin Raye
- "If I Were You" (Terri Clark song), a 1995 song by Terri Clark
- "If I Were You" (k.d. lang song), 1995
- "If I Were You" (Kasey Chambers song), a 2002 song by Kasey Chambers
- "If I Were You", a 2004 song by Candee Jay
- "If I Were You" (Hoobastank song), a 2006 song by Hoobastank
- "If I Were You", a 2014 song by 2NE1
- "If I Were U", a 2020 song by Blackbear from Everything Means Nothing
- If I Were You (band), American metalcore band
- If I Were You (EP), a 2020 EP by David James, containing a title track

== Theatre and film ==
- If I Were You (Shver tsu zayn a yid), a 1914 play by Sholem Aleichem
- If I Were You, a 1938 play by Benn Levy
- If I Were You (play), a 2006 play by Alan Ayckbourn
- If I Were You (2006 film), a Brazilian film
- If I Were You (2012 Canadian film), a comedy-drama film starring Marcia Gay Harden
- If I Were You (2012 Chinese film), a romantic comedy film

== Other uses ==
- If I Were You (podcast), a comedy advice podcast hosted by Jake and Amir
