= Living Together =

Living Together may refer to:

- Cohabitation
- Living Together (play), a 1973 play by Alan Ayckbourn
- Living Together (album), debut album of American band Vermont, or the title track
- Living Together (2011 film), an Indian Malayalam-language film by Fazil
- Living Together (2024 film), a Canadian documentary film by Halima Elkhatabi
- "Living Together", a song by the Bee Gees from their 1979 album Spirits Having Flown
- Living Together (TV series), a South Korean TV series renamed My Roommate Is a Gumiho
