= Making Tracks (play) =

Play written by Alan Ayckbourn

- Written by: Alan Ayckbourn
- Characters: Sandy; Lenny; Wolfe; Lace
- Original language: English
- Subject: Making music

Premiere
- Date premiered: 16 December 1981
- Place premiered: Stephen Joseph Theatre (Westwood site), Scarborough
- Official website

Making Tracks was a 1981 musical play with words by Alan Ayckbourn and music by Paul Todd. It is set in a recording studio and is about Stan, a recording studio owner in debt to businessman Wolfe, who stakes everything on singer/songwriter Sandy, whilst using the voice of Lace, who is Stan's ex-wife and Wolfe's new partner.

Although the musical enjoyed good ticket sales, critical reaction was lukewarm. The play has been only re-staged a few times, was never published, and is not available for production.
