= Drowning on Dry Land =

Drowning on Dry Land may refer to:

- Drowning on Dry Land (play), a 2004 play by Alan Ayckbourn
- "Drowning on Dry Land" (Grey's Anatomy), a television episode
- Drowning on Dry Land, a 1999 film directed by Carl Colpaert
- "Drowning on Dry Land/Fish Soup", a song by Manfred Mann's Earth Band from Watch
- "Drownin' on Dry Land", a song by Albert King from Years Gone By
- So-called secondary or dry drowning.
