= The Boy Who Fell into a Book =

1998 family play by Alan Ayckbourn

The Boy Who Fell Into a Book
- Original language: English
- Written by: Alan Ayckbourn
- Characters: Kevin; Rockfist Slim; Monique; Green Shark
- Subject: Reading, Imagination

Premiere
- Date: 4 December 1998
- Place: Stephen Joseph Theatre, Scarborough
- Official website

The Boy Who Fell Into a Book is a 1998 family play by British playwright Alan Ayckbourn. It was premièred as the Stephen Joseph Theatre's 1998 Christmas production to mark the 1999 National Year of Reading. It is about a boy, Kevin, who finds himself teamed up with a fictional detective, Rockfist Slim, on a journey through the books on his shelves.

This play is regarded as the forerunner to the adult's play Improbable Fiction, performed in 2005 which featured a man wandering through the stories of his writing circle colleagues.

== Musical adaptation ==
In July 2014, a musical adaptation of the play by Paul James, with music by Cathy Shostak and Eric Angus was shown at The Stephen Joseph Theatre. It was directed by Ayckbourn himself and received critical acclaim. The English Touring Theatre mounted a production of the book in 2002.

The Cast:

- Evelyn Hoskins as Kevin
- Nicolos Colicos as Rockfist Slim
- Katie Birtill as Monique and Mummy Wubbly
- Stephen Matthews as Red Gareth and Ebeneezer
- John Barr as Red Bishop and other parts
- Natasha J Barnes as the White Queen and other parts
- Musical Direction: Mark Warman

Reviews

- The Observer review
- The Guardian review
- What's On Stage review
- The Stage review
- The Scarborough News review
- The York Press review
- The Public Reviews review
- The Northern Echo review
