= The Jollies =

2002 children's play by Alan Ayckbourn

- Original language: English
- Written by: Alan Ayckbourn
- Characters: Polly; Billy; Jilly; Mr. Magico; Rambo
- Subject: Magic
- Genre: Children's
- Setting: Billy Jollie's seventh birthday

Premiere
- Date: 3 December 2002
- Place: Stephen Joseph Theatre, Scarborough
- Official website

The Jollies is a 2002 children's play by British playwright Alan Ayckbourn. It is about a young girl, Polly Jollie, where a magic trick gone awry at her brother's birthday party causes her brother, Billy, to age 25 years, and her mother, Jilly, to become 25 years younger. The play is viewed by some as the inspiration for his 2006 adult play If I Were You.
