= If I Were You (play) =

2006 play by Alan Ayckbourn

- Original language: English
- Written by: Alan Ayckbourn
- Characters: Mal Rodale; Jill Rodale; Chrissie Snaith; Sam Rodale; Dean Snaith
- Subject: Marital difficulty
- Genre: Drama / Comedy
- Setting: The Rodales' home and Mal Rodale's workplace

Premiere
- Date: 17 October 2006
- Place: Stephen Joseph Theatre, Scarborough
- Official website

If I Were You is a 2006 play by British playwright Alan Ayckbourn. It is about an unhappy married couple who are given the chance to understand each other by discovering, quite literally, what they would do "if I were you," in the same manner as the 1926 novel Turnabout by Thorne Smith.

It shares the same name and theme as the 1938 play, If I were You, by Benn Levy and Paul Hervey Fox.

== Background ==
This play was one of several attempts Alan Ayckbourn made to write a play involving swapping bodies. In 1990, Body Language was premiered, where a fat woman and a thin woman swap bodies from the neck down following a botched operation. The second attempt was in 2002's The Jollies, a young boy is transported into an adult's body whilst his mother is transported into a young girl's body.

The play was written in January 2006, initially with the title If I Were You, which was then altered to I to I before reverting to the original. However, there were no plans to produce the play that year, as the Stephen Joseph Theatre already planned to produce revivals of Intimate Exchanges and Woman in Mind. However, on 21 February 2006, Alan Ayckbourn suffered a stroke. As a result, directorship of Intimate Exchanges passed to Tim Luscombe, and the production of Woman in Mind was eventually dropped altogether. Whilst in hospital, Ayckbourn decided to use his latest play as a goal to work towards. I to I was scheduled for the autumn slot vacated by Woman in Mind in June, rehearsed at the rehearsal studio at his home, and the play was announced to the public, now retitled as If I Were You, in July.

It has been argued that If I Were You is part of a trend of Ayckbourn's adult plays taking inspiration from his family plays (in this case, The Jollies, which also deals with the adjustments and insights of being someone else) – the first example being Improbable Fiction and its derivation from The Boy Who Fell into A Book and My Very Own Story.

== Characters ==
There are five characters in the play. They are:

- Mal Rodale, husband, father, and manager at furniture showroom
- Jill Rodale, wife of Mal, now full-time housewife and mother
- Chrissie Snaith, Mal and Jill's married daughter
- Sam Rodale, Mal and Jill's school-age son
- Dean Snaith, Chrissie's husband and colleague of Mal

When Mal and Jill swap bodies, the actors continue playing their original body. (In other words, the actor who starts playing Mal later plays Jill in Mal's body, and vice versa.) This is in contrast to Body Language where the two actresses continued playing themselves in new bodies.

== Setting ==
The stage is split into three sections, each a room of the Rodales' house: Mal and Jill's bedroom, the kitchen, and the living room. Like the setting used in Bedroom Farce and Private Fears in Public Places, scene changes are controlled by switching the lighting from one area of the stage to the other. However, in a setting unique to this play, the whole stage is also used to represent the showroom floor at Mal's place of work.

The original production at the Stephen Joseph Theatre was staged in the round, but the productions on the tour were staged in the Proscenium.

The play takes place over two consecutive days, one day for each act. The tones of the two acts are very different: the first act is amongst the darkest drama found in Ayckbourn plays, whilst the second act is almost farcical with a happy ending.

== Synopsis ==
Act One begins as the alarm in Mal and Jill's bedroom goes off, and Mal reaches for it. They rise for breakfast, and Sam, their son, tries to get Jill to sign a permission form for an after-school drama group without Mal knowing, but Mal finds the form and rips it up. It is unclear what Mal does not like about it, other than claiming acting is men prancing around in tights. Sam is openly contemptuous of his father, whilst Mal is openly disappointed with his son, unlike his daughter, Chrissie, who worked hard at school, found her man, got pregnant and got married (in that order). Mal's prized son-in-law, Dean, arrives at the house, and prior to setting off for work together, Dean speaks of how successful his marriage is (his proudest example being his wife making him cooked breakfast every day apart from Sunday when he makes her breakfast).

At work, Mal faces a number of problems involving customers and staff and handles them aggressively. He also tries to fend off calls on his mobile from a woman he has been having an affair with on lunch breaks. Meanwhile, at home, Jill confides with Chrissie, her daughter, that she knows of Mal's affair. Chrissie talks of her marriage in a far less positive light than her husband gave earlier, wondering if she has gone frigid after giving birth. Jill notices that Chrissie keeps rubbing her arm, and finds out that Dean sometimes hits her. After school, Sam's news that he got the part he wanted (in spite of no signed form) is little cheer to Jill. Mal and Dean return home having been out drinking, and Dean insists on driving Chrissie and the baby home in spite of Chrissie's pleas not to.

Jill and Mal also argue, with Jill clearly regretting not having worked for fifteen years. In a moment left on her own, Jill weeps and says "God help us". She and Mal go to bed. In the morning, the alarm goes off again, and this time, it is Jill who reaches for the alarm – except that she only reaches as far as Mal would have reached for it. In fact, Jill and Mal have sometime swapped bodies, and the act ends as they make this discovery.

At the start of Act Two, Mal and Jill hastily agree not to tell anyone what has happened and to act out each other's lives as normal. Sam notices something is strange – Jill (in Mal's body) daintily and meticulously cleans the kitchen surface, whilst Mal (in Jill's body) slouches and wears the most ghastly choice of clothes but ignores it. Jill goes to work and, to Dean's astonishment, sets to work cleaning the furniture in the shop. She also defuses the problems that Mal created the previous day, although going a little over the top in dealing with a stressed member of staff.

Meanwhile, Mal has the chance to get to know his children better as they open up to him, believing him to be their mother. Mal is deflated to learn from Chrissie that Jill knew about his affair all along, but is horrified to discover what Dean has been doing to her. When Sam returns home, he reads out a passage to Mal (as Francis Flute playing Thisbe in A Midsummer Night's Dream), almost moving him to tears. When asking Sam about acting, Mal gives the game away that he is worried his son might be gay. When he learns the real reason Sam acts – that he has a crush on his female drama teacher – Mal proudly says "That's my boy!" When Dean returns home, Mal punches him on sight. Jill uses the opportunity to end Mal's affair by telling his mistress over the phone that it is too dangerous, pointing out that Jill has just attacked her son-in-law. Jill makes Mal a sandwich, giving Sam a chance to bond with his father. Sam puts his parents' strange behaviour down to aliens.

Mal and Jill retire to bed, and Jill says that if they ever get their own bodies back, she must start working again. In bed, in the middle of the night, they find they are back to normal. They agree not to forget what has happened and talk about it in the morning, and the play ends as they sleep in each other's arms.

== Productions ==
The original production at the Stephen Joseph Theatre had its first performance on 12 October 2006, and an opening night on 17 October 2006. featured the following cast:

- Jill Rodale – Liza Goddard
- Mal Rodale – John Branwell
- Chrissie Snaith – Saskia Butler
- Dean Snaith – Andrew Brookes
- Sam Rodale – David Hartley

The production team were:

- Director – Alan Ayckbourn
- Design – Roger Glossop
- Lighting – Mick Hughes
- Costumes – Jennie Boyer

In 2007, the production toured, with Richard Stacey replacing Andrew Brookes as Dean and Dominic Hecht replacing David Hartley as Sam. The other three roles were reprised, apart from the first three weeks where Terence Booth played Mal, temporarily replacing John Branwell, who was taken ill.

In 2010, Bill Kenwright mounted a new production of If I Were You, directed by Joe Harmston and starring original cast member Liza Goddard. This production opened on 18 May 2010 at the Theatre Royal Windsor prior to a national tour, with the following cast:

- Jill Rodale – Liza Goddard
- Mal Rodale – Jack Ellis
- Chrissie Snaith – Lauren Drummond
- Dean Snaith – Ayden Callaghan
- Sam Rodale – David Osmond

== Critical reviews ==
The Stephen Joseph Theatre production attracted considerable attention during its Scarborough run and the tour. In many of the reviews, attention was shared between the play itself and Alan Ayckbourn's decision to return to the theatre following his stroke. Those reviews which did so applauded Ayckbourn's decision.

The comments on the play itself were equally positive in most of the reviews. Credit was given for the scene where Sam moves his father with his Shakespearian speech, the effective switch between the home and the furniture showroom, and the ability of the two leading actors to switch roles halfway through the play.

The only major review with a negative slant came from Alfred Hickling of The Guardian, who was critical over the lack of explanation for the body-swapping. However, other reviews were positive about the low-key way the switch was done.

Perhaps the most positive comment was made by Dominic Cavendish of The Daily Telegraph: "If I were him, I'd take it easy for the next few months. If I were a West End producer, I'd book this sharpish."
