= The Revengers' Comedies =

1989 play by Alan Ayckbourn

- 1991 West End production poster
- Original language: English
- Written by: Alan Ayckbourn
- Characters: Henry Bell; Karen Knightly; Imogen Staxton-Billing
- Genre: Black comedy

Premiere
- Date: 13 June 1989
- Place: Stephen Joseph Theatre, Scarborough, North Yorkshire
- Official website

The Revengers' Comedies is a play by Alan Ayckbourn. Its title references that of The Revenger's Tragedy. The play is an epic piece running more than five hours and was designed to be presented in two parts. It was inspired by the playwright's love of films and references many notable movies, particularly the Alfred Hitchcock classic Strangers on a Train.

== Plot ==
The plot focuses on two disparate characters. Henry Bell is a 42-year-old executive, divorced and recently fired from his job, and Karen Knightly is 25 years old, wealthy, very eccentric, and recently abandoned by her lover Anthony Staxton-Billing, who opted to return to his wife Imogen. Both are intent on committing suicide by leaping from the Albert Bridge in London. When neither succeeds, they strike a bargain whereby each agrees to exact revenge on behalf of the other.

Karen finds employment at Lembridge Tennit, the conglomerate for which Henry worked, and in short order two of her bosses meet violent deaths and a third has a nervous breakdown. Henry, meanwhile, is finding it difficult to keep his end of the bargain, since he has fallen in love with Imogen. Instead of planning her demise, he begins an affair with the beguiling woman. After accidentally killing her husband, Henry finds himself torn between marrying her and fulfilling his promise to Karen by disposing of her. In the end, love prevails, and a thwarted Karen hurls herself into the Thames.

== Productions ==
The play premiered at the Stephen Joseph Theatre, a theatre in the round, in Scarborough, North Yorkshire on 13 June 1989, with Jon Strickland as Henry, Christine Kavanagh as Karen, and Elizabeth Bell as Imogen. It proved to be a critical and commercial success.

Ayckbourn was anxious to open a West End production at the Royal National Theatre, which he felt was the only London venue capable of accommodating the complicated staging. The National was interested only if the two parts were condensed into one play, but Ayckbourn refused. Producer Michael Codron was willing to stage the plays as written, and Part I opened at the Strand Theatre on 16 October 1991, with Part II presented the following night. The cast included Griff Rhys Jones as Henry, then relatively unknown Lia Williams as Karen, and Joanna Lumley as Imogen. Williams won the Critics' Circle Theatre Award for Most Promising Newcomer Award for her performance.

Because the Strand is a traditional proscenium theatre, staging was problematic, and moving walkways designed to allow the sets to move quickly proved to be expensive. Audiences didn't respond well to a format that required them to attend two performances to see a complete play, and ticket sales suffered as a result. The plays closed on 4 January 1992.

== Adaptations ==
BBC Radio World Service adapted the plays for broadcast in 1995. Three years later, a film version entitled Sweet Revenge was written and directed by Malcolm Mowbray, but it failed to find a distributor. It was telecast by BBC Two in December 1999 and eventually released on DVD.
