= Miss Yesterday =

2004 play by Alan Ayckbourn

- Written by: Alan Ayckbourn
- Characters: Tammy; Tamara; Ian; Roz; Andrew; Josie
- Original language: English
- Subject: Time travel / changing history
- Genre: Family drama
- Setting: Tammy's house and various other locations

Premiere
- Date premiered: 2 December 2004
- Place premiered: Stephen Joseph Theatre, Scarborough
- Official website

Miss Yesterday is a 2004 play by the British playwright Alan Ayckbourn. It was, like My Sister Sadie shown the previous year, billed as a "family" play in the Stephen Joseph Theatre's Christmas production. It is about a teenage girl who is sent back in time one day to prevent the death of her older brother in a motorcycle accident.

Though still unpublished, the play was performed by amateurs in the studio of the York Theatre Royal in March 2012.
