= The Champion of Paribanou =

1996 family play by Alan Ayckbourn

- Original language: English
- Written by: Alan Ayckbourn
- Characters: The Sultan; Houssain; Ali; Ahmed; Grand Vizier; Murganah; Princess Nouronnihar; Schaibar; Paribanou
- Subject: Family fantasy adventure

Premiere
- Date: 29 November 1996
- Place: Stephen Joseph Theatre, Scarborough
- Official website

The Champion of Paribanou is a 1996 family play by British playwright Alan Ayckbourn, premièred at the Stephen Joseph Theatre. It was the first Ayckbourn play to be premièred in its current site at the former Odeon cinema, and made heavy use of additional technical capability offered by the new theatre. It is about a young prince, Ahmed, who finds himself drawn into an epic quest to against his childhood friend, Murganah, who sold her soul to the devil-like Schaibar.
