= Neighbourhood Watch (Ayckbourn play) =

Play by Alan Ayckbourn

- Original language: English
- Written by: Alan Ayckbourn
- Characters: Dorothy; Rod; Luther; Martin; Gareth; Amy; Magda; Hilda
- Subject: Taking the law into own hands, authoritarian ideals
- Genre: Black Comedy

Premiere
- Date: 13 September 2011
- Place: Stephen Joseph Theatre, Scarborough
- Official website

Neighbourhood Watch is a 2011 play by Alan Ayckbourn. The play premiered on 13 September 2011 at the Stephen Joseph Theatre in Scarborough.

== Plot ==
The play centers around a brother and sister who innocently set up a Neighbourhood Watch group following petty crime from a nearby estate, only for the group to go out of control and become an authoritarian force controlling the lives of the people they are supposed to protect.

== Reception ==
Critics were generally favourable with Michael Billington from The Guardian calling it "highly ambitious" and "biliously funny" while The Daily Telegraph and The Stage also gave it positive reviews.

A performance starring Paul Lavers was held at the Gordon Craig Theatre in Stevenage in May 2018.
