= Living Together (play) =

- Written by: Alan Ayckbourn
- Series: The Norman Conquests

Premiere
- Date premiered: May 25, 1973
- Official website

Living Together is a 1973 play by British playwright Alan Ayckbourn. It is one of the plays in The Norman Conquests trilogy, which together form one of Ayckbourn's most popular works.

The trilogy covers a traumatic family weekend in a Victorian country house from the vantage point of three different areas: dining room, living room and garden. Living Together covers the action that takes place in the living room.
