= It Could Be Any One Of Us =

Play written by Alan Ayckbourn

- Written by: Alan Ayckbourn
- Characters: Mortimer Chalke; Jocelyn Polegate; Brinton Chalke; Amy Polegate; Norris Honeywell; Wendy Windwood
- Original language: English
- Subject: Murder mystery

Premiere
- Date premiered: 5 October 1983
- Place premiered: Stephen Joseph Theatre (Westwood site), Scarborough
- Official website

It Could Be Any One Of Us is a 1983 play by British playwright Alan Ayckbourn. This play is a murder mystery, but with only subtle changes to the play, there are three possible endings, each naming a different character as the murderer.
