= Private Fears in Public Places (film) =

- Directed by: Alain Resnais
- Written by: Jean-Michel Ribes
- Produced by: Bruno Pésery
- Starring: Sabine Azéma; Lambert Wilson; André Dussollier; Pierre Arditi; Laura Morante; Isabelle Carré; Claude Rich
- Cinematography: Éric Gautier
- Edited by: Hervé de Luze
- Music by: Mark Snow
- Distributed by: Mars Distribution
- Release dates: 2 September 2006 (Venice Film Festival); 22 November 2006 (France)
- Running time: 120 minutes
- Country: France
- Language: French
- Budget: $11 million
- Box office: $4 million

Private Fears in Public Places (French: Cœurs, lit. 'Hearts'), is a 2006 French comedy-drama film directed by Alain Resnais. It was adapted from Alan Ayckbourn's 2004 play Private Fears in Public Places. The film won several awards, including a Silver Lion at the Venice Film Festival.

== Background ==
For the second time in his career Alain Resnais turned to an Alan Ayckbourn play for his source material (having previously adapted another play for Smoking/No Smoking), and remained close to the original structure while transferring the setting and milieu from provincial England to the 13th arrondissement of Paris (contrary to his usual preference).

The film consists of over 50 short scenes, usually featuring two characters - occasionally three or just one. Scenes are linked by dissolves featuring falling snow, a device similar to one which Resnais previously used in L'Amour à mort (1984).

Several of Resnais's regular actors appear in the film (Arditi, Azéma, Dussollier, Wilson), and he was joined by his longstanding technical collaborators in design and editing, but he worked for the first time with cinematographer Éric Gautier.

The fictional TV programmes called "Ces chansons qui ont changé ma vie" which feature in the film were directed by Bruno Podalydès.

== Synopsis ==
In contemporary Paris, six characters individually confront their emotional solitude as their lives intertwine. Dan (Lambert Wilson) is unemployed after being sacked from the army and spends his time drinking in a bar and telling his troubles to the longsuffering barman Lionel (Pierre Arditi). Dan's relationship with Nicole (Laura Morante) is disintegrating and through a newspaper advertisement he meets Gaëlle (Isabelle Carré), an attractive but insecure young woman who lives with her older brother Thierry (André Dussollier).

Thierry is an estate agent who has been trying to find a new apartment for Nicole and Dan. He works with Charlotte (Sabine Azéma), a middle-aged spinster and an ardent Christian, who lends him a video of an evangelical TV programme to give him inspiration. At the end of the video, Thierry discovers some unerased footage of erotic dancing by a woman he suspects to be Charlotte, and, taking this as an invitation, one day he tries to force her to kiss him in their office.

Charlotte in her spare time works as a care giver, and is assigned to look after the bed-ridden and foul-mouthed Arthur (the voice of Claude Rich) in the evenings so that his dutiful son, who is Lionel the barman, can go to work. After enduring repeated vicious tantrums from Arthur, Charlotte one evening dons a leather porno outfit and silences him with a striptease performance, before resuming her usual pious demeanour. Arthur is hospitalised next day. Gaëlle witnesses a farewell meeting between Dan and Nicole, and interpreting it as a betrayal by Dan, she flees back home to her brother. Lionel and Nicole both pack up to begin new lives. Dan resumes his place at the bar.

== Reception ==
On its release, Private Fears in Public Places received an overwhelmingly positive response in the French press, whereas the enthusiasm of the public was more measured although respectably reflected at the box-office.

British and American critics were widely sympathetic towards the film, but showed more reservations about the significance of the work.

Comments by reviewers ranged from "disappointing" and "inconsequential", to "exquisite comedy drama", and "a masterpiece by any measure".

One of the aspects noted by Anglo-American reviewers was the deliberate theatricality in the style of filming: "The film is entirely shot on sets that advertise their staginess - for example by the absence of ceilings revealed by the overhead shots, or their striking pastel colours (pinks, oranges and whites) and the repetition of frames filled with seemingly shifting partitions: etched glass, beads, ironwork, veils and so on." "...The superbly sustained aura of delicate artifice – this is a Paris where it’s always silently snowing, even, at one point, indoors – lends the characters’ repeated attempts to break free of their boxed-in lives the ritualistic magic of a fairy tale."

This mise-en-scène was also linked to the themes of loneliness and separation: "Resnais is far more interested in the divisions that set us apart - whether it is the ill-constructed inner wall that bisects the first apartment visited by Nicole, the curtain that splits Lionel's bar in two, the partition that separates Thierry's office from Charlotte's, or the thematic oppositions of heaven and hell, men and women, piety and temptation." "All of [the characters] are in search of love and companionship. They're deeply lonely, though none is a natural loner, and their individual backgrounds, and in some cases the nature of their sexuality, are only hinted at. They live in a sort of emotional and social blur..."

Another aspect of the film which was widely appreciated was the quality of the acting: "These consummate stage and film actors are one of the main reasons Resnais' work combines so effortlessly the cinematic with the theatrical."

== Accolades ==
Alain Resnais won a Silver Lion award for best direction at the 2006 Venice Film Festival, as well as the 2007 Étoile d'Or for best director and a FIPRESCI Prize at the 2007 European Film Awards. The film received seven nominations for the 2007 Césars but did not win any of the categories. Laura Morante won a Pasinetti Award for best actress at the 2006 Venice Film Festival.

- César Awards (France)
  - Nominated: Best Cinematography (Eric Gautier)
  - Nominated: Best Costume Design (Jackie Budin)
  - Nominated: Best Director (Alain Resnais)
  - Nominated: Best Editing (Hervé de Luze
  - Nominated: Best Music Written for a Film (Mark Snow)
  - Nominated: Best Production Design (Jacques Saulnier)
  - Nominated: Best Sound (Jean-Marie Blondel, Thomas Desjonquères and Gérard Lamps)
  - Nominated: Best Adaptation (Jean-Michel Ribes)
- Venice Film Festival (Italy)
  - Won: Pasinetti Award for Best Actress (Laura Morante
  - Won: Silver Lion for Best Director (Alain Resnais)
  - Nominated: Golden Lion (Alain Resnais)
