= House & Garden (plays) =

Two plays written by Alan Ayckbourn to be performed simultaneously

House and Garden
- Original language: English
- Written by: Alan Ayckbourn
- Characters: Teddy Platt; Trish Platt; Sally Platt; Giles Mace; Joanna Mace; Jake Mace; Gavin Ryng-Mayne; Barry Love; Lindy Love; Lucille Cadeau; Fran Briggs; Warn Coucher; Izzie Truce; Pearl Truce
- Subject: Politics

Premiere
- Date: 19 June 1999
- Place: Stephen Joseph Theatre, Scarborough
- Official website

House and Garden are a diptych (or linked pair) of plays written by the English playwright Alan Ayckbourn, first performed in 1999. They are designed to be staged simultaneously, with the same cast in adjacent auditoria, and were published together as House & Garden. House takes place in the drawing room, and Garden in the grounds, of a large country house. Each play is self-contained (although each refers more or less obliquely to events in the other), and they may be attended in either order. As is typical of his work, Ayckbourn portrays the mostly bittersweet relationships between more or less unhappy, upper-middle-class people. The title is a tongue-in-cheek reference to the magazine House & Garden, in which country houses and gardens are often portrayed as idyllic, peaceful places.

== Production history ==
After performances in 1999 at the Stephen Joseph Theatre in Scarborough, the plays were staged in 2000 at the Royal National Theatre in London with a cast including Jane Asher, David Haig and Sian Thomas, and in 2001 at the Royal and Derngate theatres in Northampton. Then again in 2004 at Salisbury Playhouse directed by Tim Luscombe and 2005 at Harrogate Theatre directed by Hannah Chissick.

== The plays ==
Act I of each play takes place in the morning, before lunch, and Act II in the afternoon, of a single Saturday in August.

=== Synopses ===
==== House ====
In House, the marriage of Teddy and Trish Platt is breaking up because of Teddy's affair with their near neighbour Jo Mace (who is married to Giles, one of Teddy's best friends). Jake Mace, Giles and Jo's son, is in love with Teddy and Trish's politically aware daughter, Sally, although his regard for her seems not to be reciprocated. It is the day of the garden fête, and the French film actress Lucille Cadeau arrives to open it. The novelist and political advisor Gavin Ryng-Mayne also arrives for lunch, to sound Teddy out about continuing his family's tradition of standing for Parliament. Although Lucille speaks no English, everyone except Teddy seems to be able to speak French. Even so, Teddy hits it off with Lucille over lunch (his friends and family practically ignoring him because of his affair with Jo), but he completely fails to convince Ryng-Mayne that he is up to politics, and equally fails to save his marriage. We also witness Ryng-Mayne's callous upsetting of Sally. Trish, after a heart-to-heart talk with Jake, leaves for good, and Jake at last gets around, albeit awkwardly, to asking Sally to go out with him.

==== Garden ====
In Garden, preparations are underway for the fête, which is seemingly organised every year by Barry and Lindy Love (with minimal assistance), who are kept busy throughout the first act erecting tents and putting up side shows. We see the development of the unconventional relationship between Izzie, the Platts' housekeeper, Pearl, her daughter, and Warn, the Platts' taciturn gardener. We witness Trish's denouement with Jo. Jo, finally realising that her affair with Teddy has not been kept secret, faces up to the consequences with limited effectiveness. During an afternoon downpour, which is just one of many mishaps to befall the fête, we also witness the hilarious consummation of Teddy's and Lucille's infatuation. Lindy's exasperation with the boredom of her marriage to the patronising Barry finally hits home, and she quietly absconds to London with Ryng-Mayne in his Porsche. As Lucille is carted off to the alcoholics' clinic, Trish leaves, and Teddy is left alone on stage.

== Dramaturgy ==
The dramatic devices employed for humour are many, such as Teddy's ironic insensitivity in asking Giles for marital advice, when the audience can see that the problem is Teddy's affair with Giles' wife. Giles extends the irony further by suggesting the problem is lack of sex. Trish spends most of House ignoring her husband, to the extent of bemoaning his absence to guests when he is actually in the room with them. In Garden there is an innovative scene where the two characters on stage (Teddy and Lucille) expound their situations and frustrations in their respective languages, and while neither understands what the other is saying each believes the other to be a kindred spirit.

The chilling, merciless Gavin Ring-Mayne was perceived as a satirical portrait of the politician Peter Mandelson (indeed Paul Allen reports that some people worried that the portrait was too accurate), but Ayckbourn also sees elements of Jeffrey Archer in the character. Paul Allen has observed that Ayckbourn's range is such that he has no need to limit himself to the lampooning of just one political figure.
