= My Sister Sadie =

Play written by Alan Ayckbourn

- Written by: Alan Ayckbourn
- Characters: Luke Pickett; Avril Pickett; Sadie; Dr Thora Grayling; Capt Leonard Lennox; Sgt Jipton; Lisa
- Original language: English
- Subject: Family, science fiction
- Genre: Family Drama
- Setting: Various locations around the Picketts' home

Premiere
- Date premiered: 2 December 2003
- Place premiered: Stephen Joseph Theatre, Scarborough
- Official website

My Sister Sadie is a 2003 play by British playwright Alan Ayckbourn. It was billed as a "family" play, and shown as the Stephen Joseph Theatre's Christmas production. It is about a seventeen-year-old boy who finds, emerging from a helicopter crash, a mysterious female who calls herself "Sadie", with an uncanny resemblance to his dead sister, with a military platoon in hot pursuit of a missing deadly weapon.
