= Time of My Life (play) =

Play by Alan Ayckbourn

Time Of My Life is a play by Alan Ayckbourn. It premiered at the Stephen Joseph Theatre in Scarborough on 21 April 1992 then in the West End on 3 August 1993.

It was revived by the author in the summer of 2013.

== Plot ==
The play is set in three different periods of time in a small Italian restaurant in Northern England.

When Gerry Stratton plans a family meal out with his two grown up sons to celebrate his wife, Laura's 54th birthday and proposes an almost prophetic toast to ‘happy times’, he has no idea of the events that will unfold over the course of that evening. Their elder son, Glyn (played by John Pickard), is now back together with his long-suffering wife Stephanie, and their younger son, Adam has brought along his new girlfriend, an outrageous hairdresser, to meet the Stratton family for the first time.

Family skeletons intrude on cheerful domesticity as we get a glimpse of Glyn and Stephanie's story unfolding in the future scenes. Meanwhile, at another table in the same restaurant, Adam and Maureen's story is played out in reverse chronology, with Gerry and Laura remaining in the present time unpicking their marriage and recalling first love.

== Productions ==
The original London production ran at The Vaudeville for twelve weeks in 1993 after its premier in Scarborough to positive reviews.

It was revived under Ayckbourn's direction at regional theatres but despite an Off-Broadway production, it never had a London run. However it will be revived in March 2015 at The Tabard Theatre in London.

== Cast ==
- Gerry Stratton, head of a builders' firm
- Laura Stratton, Gerry's wife
- Glyn Stratton, their elder son
- Adam Stratton, their younger son
- Stephanie, Glyn's wife
- Maureen, Adam's girlfriend
- Calvinu, Tuto, Aggi, Bengie, Dinka- waiters in the restaurant, all played by the same actor
