= Drowning on Dry Land (play) =

2004 play by Alan Ayckbourn

- Original language: English
- Written by: Alan Ayckbourn
- Characters: Charlie Conrad; Linzi Ellison; Jason Ratcliffe; Hugo de Préscourt; Gale Gilchrist; Marsha Bates; Simeon Diggs
- Subject: Celebrity culture
- Genre: Comedy
- Setting: Grounds of Charlie Conrad's house

Premiere
- Date: 4 May 2004
- Place: Stephen Joseph Theatre, Scarborough
- Official website

Drowning on Dry Land is a 2004 play by British playwright Alan Ayckbourn, his 66th to be produced. Exploring the culture of B-list celebrities, it is a comedy about the rise and fall of Charlie Conrad, a man apparently famous for being a failure.

== Background ==
Alan Ayckbourn's previous play about the celebrity culture was Man of the Moment, with one of the main characters a megastar, even though the publicity that triggered his celebrity career was his involvement in a horrific bank robbery.

In the few years before Drowning on Dry Land was written, celebrity culture (propagated by a deluge of tabloid images and celebrity magazine gossip, and helped along by the emergence of reality TV shows such as Big Brother) rose to a point where people were becoming famous for no particular reason at all. As Dame Edna Everage once remarked: "celebrity is the new nonentity".

The incident that led to the inspiration for the play was a moment in the 2003 Piers Morgan documentary The Importance of Being Famous where a young girl jumps up and down in a field for several minutes, then asks "Am I famous yet?" This quote was originally intended as the title of the play. However, after looking through a dictionary of quotations, he came across an old English proverb, "It is folly to drown on dry land". The title was changed accordingly, and a similar line was included towards the end of the play.

By a fortunate coincidence (from the play's point of view), two tabloid stories were featuring in the celebrity news during the launch of the play: David Beckham's affair with Rebecca Loos and Leslie Grantham's antics in front of a webcam, thus helping to publicise the production.

Several of Ayckbourn's observations about celebrity culture have obvious influences in the play. One notable quote was his opinion that a dangerous mistake celebrities can make is to believe all the good things said about them, both in publicity and what other people (particularly agents) say. He also suggested that in an age of increasing anonymity, some are increasingly desperate to be noticed. The play also follows the theory that when one quickly rises to the top, one can fall just as quickly and mercilessly.

== Characters ==
There are seven adult characters in the play. They are:

- Charlie Conrad, celebrity
- Linzi Ellison, Charlie's wife and former TV presenter
- Jason Ratcliffe, Charlie's agent
- Hugo de Préscourt, Charlie's big-shot solicitor
- Gale Gilchrist, rising television journalist
- Marsha Bates, also known as "Mr Chortles", entertainer for children's birthday party
- Simeon Diggs, Marsha Bates' solicitor

Charlie Conrad is the central character, although Linzi, Jason, Gale and Marsha all have significant roles. Hugo and Simeon appear in a single scene.

In addition, there are also two cameo parts of Laura and Kate, two children at the party.

== Setting ==
The play is set over three scenes, one long scene covering the whole of the first act, and two shorter scenes in the second act. The three scenes occur over a period of about ten weeks towards the end of Charlie's celebrity career and his sudden descent into obscurity.

Until the last moment of the performance, the location for all three scenes is a Victorian architectural folly (obvious suggestions of symbolic value acknowledged) in the grounds of Charlie Conrad's vast Home Counties mansion. In the closing moments of the play the set also represents the roof of the same folly. The original production at the Stephen Joseph Theatre was staged in-the-round.

== Synopsis ==
The play opens with Linzi telling Marsha what she wants for her small son's birthday party, but she also drops hints that all is not well between her and her husband Charlie. Linzi is frustrated that he will miss his son's birthday party while giving a celebrity interview. But at a deeper level she wants her own fame back as a TV presenter; she stopped when she had children, but got stuck afterwards as a celebrity wife. When Charlie arrives they quarrel, escalating to abuse, but the moment the journalist, Gale, appears they embrace as a happy celebrity couple.

Gale is notorious for her attacks on celebrities, but Charlie's agent, Jason, insists the interview will keep her on-side. Before the interview begins, Gale explores the folly, going through one doorway and emerging from the other, back where she started, thanks to an optical illusion that fools one into thinking one is ascending to a higher level. Jason sits in, attempting to control the interview, both he and Gale with tape recorders; but Gale steers the conversation around to how Charlie became famous. In reality, he first grabbed attention as an inept, injured sportsman being carried away from a Marathon, applauded by the crowd. Appearing on a game show he gained public sympathy by getting all the questions wrong. But invited back he eventually became celebrity host of the show. Charlie is happy to be considered useless at everything, but Gale suggests he is failing on purpose.

Jason leaves while Charlie and Gale continue to talk. He gets the impression that Gale is making a pass and she reacts accordingly. At her invitation they both enter the doorways into the folly to meet in the middle. Charlie does so enthusiastically, but Gale sneaks off. Charlie instead meets Marsha, now fully dressed as the clown, "Mr. Chortles". Marsha, who holds Charlie in awe (proof to her that anyone can be famous), asks him to autograph her thigh. Suddenly, as Charlie is removing Marsha's bloomers, two little girls from the party enter with Linzi, closely followed by Gale and Jason. The spell broken, Marsha runs into the folly, leaving Charlie with her bloomers in his hands. Then, emerging from the other door, she sees everyone, turns and runs back in.

Act Two: two weeks later, Charlie's celebrity career is taking a hammering from the incident widely reported by Gale. As some consolation, Gale's own career is also in trouble when her lesbian partner (well known to all but Charlie) is caught dealing drugs. He meets his solicitor, Hugo, to arrange a settlement with Marsha, pressing charges for sexual intimidation and indecent assault. Marsha arrives with Simeon, her own solicitor. Hugo starts by asking Marsha and Simeon to establish the facts of the case, but when Marsha confirms she was dressed as a clown, Hugo suggests Charlie wouldn't have known she was a woman, and turns the meeting into a belittling interrogation, a mini-courtroom drama. Marsha rips open her blouse and shouts "I am a woman!" as Simeon drags her away.

Before leaving in his helicopter, Hugo promises a favourable out-of-court settlement and, as an afterthought, mentions that Linzi is starting divorce proceedings. Linzi appears, more civil than last time, confirms this, and says she is now looking to restart her own career.

In the closing scene, two months later, although Hugo has kept the case out of court, Charlie's fame has collapsed to insignificance — not even a mention in the "Where are they now?" columns. Looking for the last time at the house and grounds he has sold, he meets Jason, who gives him the news that (boosted by media attention from the thigh-signing scandal) Marsha is doing well as Mr. Chortles. Jason also tells Charlie that he is retiring and thinking of selling his memoirs — mentioning that obviously Charlie will be part of the story.

Gale arrives, now "freelance" — her optimistic description of her own collapsed career. She wants to photograph Charlie sitting with a clown costume strewn around him, which she thinks could be her next big break — a view not shared by Charlie. With this done Charlie meets a happier Linzi, looking very different from the Linzi at the start of the play. Out of Charlie's spotlight, she is now a children's show presenter with Marsha as next week's guest. She amicably urges Charlie not to believe the good things written about him, for "you can drown, even on dry land."

Left alone, Charlie accidentally scares away a couple of young girls. He enters the folly, as lighting and sound change to represent a new location. Emerging from the passage he discovers that at long last he has reached the top. Gazing at the view he shouts triumphantly: "I did it!"

== Productions ==
The play was first performed at the Stephen Joseph Theatre on 29 April 2004 with an opening night on 4 May 2004. The cast were:

- Charlie Conrad – Stephen Beckett
- Linzi Ellison – Melanie Gutteridge
- Jason Ratcliffe – Adrian McLoughlin
- Hugo de Préscourt – Stuart Fox
- Gale Gilchrist – Billie-Claire Wright
- Marsha Bates – Sarah Moyle
- Simeon Diggs – Paul Kemp

Most notable in this line-up was Stephen Beckett in the lead role. Having previously played significant roles in The Bill and Coronation Street, he had his own experience of celebrity-driven media attention to draw on, thereby causing some speculation that the character was based on him. Although he was not drawn in specially for his role (he had appeared in Stephen Joseph Theatre productions before), Alan Ayckbourn reportedly said there was an instinct of Charlie that was like him.

Billie-Claire Wright was the first black actor to appear in an original production of an Ayckbourn play, although the part of Gale was not expressly written for a black actress. (The first parts written specifically as black characters were Winnie and Laverne in My Wonderful Day, played by Ayesha Antoine and Petra Letang.)

The production team were:

- Director – Alan Ayckbourn
- Designer – Roger Glossop
- Lighting Designer – Mick Hughes
- Costume Designer – Christine Wall
- Original Music – David Newton

The production subsequently toured. London was not included in the tour, partly due to the West End's treatment of Damsels in Distress two years previously. However, performances were made in other south-east venues close to London. Alexandra Mathie replaced Billie Claire-Wright as Imogen in the tour.

Six of the seven adult actors (Stuart Fox being the exception) also appeared in Private Fears in Public Places — a play inspired during the rehearsals for Drowning on Dry Land — during the run at the Stephen Joseph Theatre.

In 2008, Drowning on Dry Land was revived by the Salisbury playhouse.

== Critical reviews ==
Drowning on Dry Land drew a fair amount of attention owing to the stories dominating the press at the time of production. Comparisons were made to David and Victoria Beckham, and the reviews were near-unanimous in praise of Hugo's savaging of Marsha. The critics were generally sympathetic to Charlie Conrad. Ian Shuttleworth for the Financial Times wrote: "Charlie's gift is to be "useless at everything" in a kind of apotheosis of ordinariness. He is also a typical Ayckbourn innocent: caught up in the machinery but fundamentally good-hearted and too trusting".

However, the reception was, on the whole, lukewarm compared to some earlier works. For The Independent, Lynne Walker wrote: "Our most prolific and popular playwright seems to have forgotten that the twists and turns in a storyline do need to be plausible rather than just the vehicle for a sequence of ideas, no matter how cunning they are in themselves", while Sam Marlowe for The Times concluded: "Drowning on Dry Land is like its hapless anti-hero: there's not much more to it than meets the eye".

By the end of 2005, the reception of the play had been dwarfed by the other Ayckbourn play of the season, Private Fears in Public Places, which had enjoyed glowing reviews during its New York run.
