= The Sparrow (1967 play) =

Play by Alan Ayckbourn

- Original language: English
- Written by: Alan Ayckbourn
- Characters: Ed; Evie; Tony; Julia
- Subject: Love, revenge, manipulation

Premiere
- Date: 13 July 1967
- Place: Library Theatre, Scarborough
- Official website

The Sparrow is a 1967 play by British playwright Alan Ayckbourn. It has since been withdrawn from production by Ayckbourn.

== Synopsis ==
In The Sparrow Ed brings home Evie, who he has just met after having had a one-night stand with his flatmate Tony's wife, Julia. Tony takes revenge on both Ed and Julia by employing Evie in a non-existent business.

== Main characters ==
- Ed, a bus conductor
- Evie, a young woman whom Ed met at a dance
- Tony, a businessman, Ed's flatmate
- Julia, Tony's wife

== Productions ==
Ayckbourn directed the world première of The Sparrow on 13 July 1967 at the Library Theatre Scarborough, with the following cast:

- Evie - Pamela Craig
- Ed - John Nettles
- Tony - Robert Powell
- Julia - Heather Stoney
