= Body Language (play) =

1990 play by Alan Ayckbourn

- Written by: Alan Ayckbourn
- Characters: Hravic Zyergefoovc; Freya Roope; Benjamin Cooper; Ronnie Weston; Angie Dell; Derek Short; Jo Knapton; Mal Bennet
- Original language: English
- Subject: Body image

Premiere
- Date premiered: 21 May 1990
- Place premiered: Stephen Joseph Theatre (Westwood site), Scarborough
- Official website

Body Language is a 1990 play by British playwright Alan Ayckbourn. It is about two women, one thin and one fat, who have their bodies swapped as a result of a botched operation.
