= The Norman Conquests =

1973 trilogy of plays by Alan Ayckbourn

The Norman Conquests is a trilogy of plays written in 1973 by Alan Ayckbourn. Each of the plays depicts the same six characters over the same weekend in a different part of a house. Table Manners is set in the dining room, Living Together in the living room, and Round and Round the Garden in the garden.

The plays were first performed in Scarborough, before runs in London and on Broadway. A television version was first broadcast in the UK during October 1977.

== Outline ==
The small scale of the drama is typical of Ayckbourn. There are only six characters, namely Norman, his wife Ruth, her brother Reg and his wife Sarah, Ruth's and Reg's sister Annie, and Tom, Annie's next-door-neighbour. A seventh unseen and unheard character is in the house, upstairs: the bedridden mother of Reg, Ruth and Annie.

The plays are at times wildly comic, and at times poignant, in their portrayals of the relationships among the six characters.

Each play is self-contained, and they may be watched in any order. Some of the scenes overlap, and on several occasions a character's exit from one play corresponds with an entrance in another. Similarly, noise and commotion in one room can sometimes be heard by characters in another.

The plays were not written to be performed simultaneously, although Ayckbourn did achieve that some twenty-five years later in House & Garden.

The premise is that Annie lives in a countryside house taking care of her demanding mother, and has decided that she needs a weekend off. Reg and Sarah have agreed to come and take care of Annie's and Reg's mother for a week-end while Annie goes on a short trip. However, Annie is secretly planning to meet up with her sister Ruth's charming, rakish husband Norman for an illicit weekend together (something Annie has never done before, and is unsure about). However, things go wrong when Norman shows up at the house early to pick up Annie contrary to plan, and everybody ends up at the house for the entire week-end. Various arguments ensue while the characters have differing degrees of understanding about what's actually happening.

== Production history ==
The plays were first performed in Scarborough, before a season in London, with a cast that included Tom Courtenay as Norman, Penelope Keith as Sarah, Felicity Kendal as Annie, Michael Gambon as Tom, Bridget Turner as Ruth, and Mark Kingston as Reg.

The plays originally premiered on Broadway in 1975 for 69 performances at the Morosco Theatre, directed by Eric Thompson and featuring Richard Benjamin, Ken Howard, Barry Nelson, Estelle Parsons, Paula Prentiss, and Carole Shelley.

The first major London revival of The Norman Conquests was presented at The Old Vic Theatre in 2008 with Matthew Warchus directing a cast including Stephen Mangan as Norman, Jessica Hynes as Annie, Ben Miles as Tom, Amanda Root as Sarah, Paul Ritter as Reg and Amelia Bullmore as Ruth. The Old Vic auditorium was transformed to a theatre in the round, known as the CQS Space, especially for this production.

The 2008 Old Vic production opened on Broadway with the London cast at the Circle in the Square Theatre on 7 April 2009, official opening 23 April, and scheduled closing on 25 July 2009.

== Television adaptation ==
In 1977 the plays were adapted for television by Thames Television. Penelope Keith reprised her role as Sarah. The rest of the cast featured Tom Conti as Norman, Penelope Wilton (who had played Ruth in the original 1974 London stage production) as Annie, Richard Briers as Reg, David Troughton as Tom and Fiona Walker as Ruth. The three plays were directed by Herbert Wise and produced by Verity Lambert and David Susskind. Keith won the BAFTA Television Award for Best Actress for her performance.

== Awards and nominations ==
2009 Tony Awards

- Best Revival of a Play (winner)
- Best Direction of a Play – Matthew Warchus (nominated)
- Best Performance by a Featured Actor in a Play – Stephen Mangan and Paul Ritter (nominated)
- Best Performance by a Featured Actress in a Play – Jessica Hynes and Amanda Root (nominated)
- Best Scenic Design of a Play – Rob Howell (nominated)

2009 Drama Desk Awards

- Outstanding Ensemble Performance (winner)
- Outstanding Revival of a Play (winner)
- Outstanding Director of a Play – Matthew Warchus (winner)
- Outstanding Music in a Play – Gary Yershon (nominated)
- Outstanding Set Design of a Play – Rob Howell (nominated)
- Outstanding Costume Design – Rob Howell (nominated)

New York Drama Critics' Circle

- Special citation, Matthew Warchus and the cast of The Norman Conquests

Outer Critics Circle Awards

- Outstanding Revival of a Play (winner)
- Outstanding Director of a Play (winner)
- Outstanding Ensemble Performance (winner)
