= Life of Riley (play) =

2010 play by Alan Ayckbourn

- Original language: English
- Written by: Alan Ayckbourn
- Characters: Kathryn; Colin; Simeon; Tamsin; Jack; Monica
- Subject: Terminal illness, relationships
- Genre: Comedy

Premiere
- Date: 21 September 2010
- Place: Stephen Joseph Theatre, Scarborough
- Official website

Life of Riley is a 2010 play by Alan Ayckbourn. It was first performed at the Stephen Joseph Theatre, Scarborough.

== Structure ==
It is set over a period over the seven months that a man called George Riley is diagnosed with a terminal illness, although George Riley does not appear in the play himself and is only ever referred to by the six onstage characters.

This play is the only Ayckbourn play to directly reference another Ayckbourn play (Relatively Speaking) within the story.

== Characters ==
- George Riley (unseen)
- Colin
- Kathryn
- Jack
- Tamsin
- Monica - Riley's ex-wife
- Simeon
- Small boy (unseen)
- Teenage daughter (unseen)
- Basil Bender (unseen)

== Adaptation into film ==
The play was filmed by the French director Alain Resnais, as Aimer, boire et chanter (2014).
