= Sweet Revenge (1998 film) =

- DVD cover
- Directed by: Malcolm Mowbray
- Written by: Malcolm Mowbray
- Produced by: Simon Bosanquet
- Starring: Sam Neill; Helena Bonham Carter; Kristin Scott Thomas
- Cinematography: Romain Winding
- Edited by: Barrie Vince
- Music by: Alexandre Desplat
- Release date: 1998
- Running time: 90 minutes
- Country: United Kingdom
- Language: English

Sweet Revenge is a 1998 British black comedy film written and directed by Malcolm Mowbray, adapted from Alan Ayckbourn's play The Revenger's Comedies. The film follows Henry Bell and Karen Knightly, two disillusioned characters who, after meeting on a bridge where both are contemplating suicide, form a pact to carry out revenge on each other’s behalf. This sets off a series of absurd and farcical events, with dark humor highlighting the futility and ridiculousness of their revenge schemes. The film satirizes human behavior, blending Ayckbourn's sharp wit with Mowbray’s comedic direction.

The film had a brief and modestly successful theatrical run in Italy under the title Amori e vendette (Loves and Vendettas) but failed to find a distributor elsewhere. It eventually was telecast in the UK by BBC Two on 30 December 1999, under the title The Revengers' Comedies. It was released on videotape in the United States and France and on DVD in the US.

== Plot ==
Conservative Henry Bell has been eased out of his job by condescending Bruce Tick, while wealthy and wildly eccentric Karen Knightly has been abandoned by her lover Anthony Staxton-Billing, who opted to return to his wife Imogen. Both are intent on committing suicide by leaping from the Tower Bridge in London. When neither succeeds, they strike a bargain whereby each agrees to exact revenge on behalf of the other, although Henry is less enthusiastic about the plan.

Karen, disguised as a frumpy office temp, finds employment as an assistant to Tick and quickly derails his marriage by leading his wife Hilary to believe he's involved in an extramarital affair. Henry, meanwhile, is finding it difficult to keep his end of the bargain, since he has fallen in love with Imogen, the object of Karen's revenge. Instead of planning her demise, he begins an affair with the beguiling woman. Henry learns that Anthony left Karen not for Imogen, but for beautician Daphne Teal, and he begins to suspect Karen is more of a villain than a victim. The woman proves to be a formidable foe when she realizes Henry may renege on their deal.

Adding to the humorous complications are Karen's oddball brother Oliver, who delights in racing through the interior of their rural mansion on his motorcycle; elderly and slightly befuddled housekeeper Winnie; and Daphne's very inept daughter Norma, who's being groomed to take over the household chores so Winnie finally can retire.

== Cast ==
- Sam Neill as Henry Bell
- Helena Bonham Carter as Karen Knightly
- Kristin Scott Thomas as Imogen Staxton-Billing
- Rupert Graves as Oliver Knightly
- Martin Clunes as Anthony Staxton-Billing
- Steve Coogan as Bruce Tick
- Liz Smith as Winnie
- Charlotte Coleman as Norma
- Anita Dobson as Daphne Teal
- John Wood as Col. Marcus
- David Dineen as Sneering Truck Driver

== Production ==
Rural scenes were filmed in Weston Turville in Buckinghamshire. Interiors were filmed at the Twickenham Film Studios in London.

== Reception ==
David Rooney of Variety called the film a "mix of dry British wit, sophisticated farce and arch eccentricity," "the kind of material that can sparkle onstage but often sits uneasily onscreen, and tends to have limited pull with today's audiences." He added, "Aside from its humor, Ayckbourn's work is notable for its brisk pacing, multilateral action and the ingenuity of its complex structuring, all qualities that lose something in the screen transfer...Mowbray's script opens out the action physically but is unable to shake off the stagy feel. To his credit, he never shies away from the savagery that flavors the best black comedies, but the verve needed to make this one a complete success is nonetheless missing." MaryAnn Johanson of FlickFilosopher.com gave it 9 out of 10 and called it "a delicious example of British humor that manages to be both over the top and understated at the same time. A must for fans of cheeky, topsy-turvy comedy. Entertainment Weekly gave it a B− grade.
