= Private Fears in Public Places =

2004 play by Alan Ayckbourn

- Original language: English
- Written by: Alan Ayckbourn
- Characters: Nicola; Stewart; Dan; Ambrose; Charlotte; Imogen; Arthur (voice only)
- Subject: Various
- Genre: Drama
- Setting: Various homes, bars and workplaces

Premiere
- Date: 17 August 2004
- Place: Stephen Joseph Theatre, Scarborough
- Official website

Private Fears in Public Places is a 2004 play by British playwright Alan Ayckbourn. The bleakest play written by Ayckbourn for many years, it intimately follows a few days in the lives of six characters, in four tightly interwoven stories through 54 scenes.

In 2006, it was made into a film Cœurs, directed by Alain Resnais.

== Background ==
The title was originally chosen for a play Ayckbourn was writing in 1994, but which was replaced by another new play, Communicating Doors.

Ten years later he used the title for this very different play – following the practice of rescuing redundant titles first employed by Ayckbourn for Absurd Person Singular back in 1972.

As with Absurd Person Singular, Private Fears in Public Places has little in common with the play for which its title was first devised. It was written for performance by the Stephen Joseph Theatre Company late in the 2004 season, using six of the seven actors already cast in Drowning on Dry Land, a new Ayckbourn play performed earlier in the year, thus to some extent repeating the repertory format used in 2001 for the Damsels in Distress trilogy when three different plays were written for the same cast.

Another influence was Ayckbourn's intention to write a "film on stage" using fast cross-cutting between scenes. In the programme notes for the play, he cited The Revengers' Comedies, Bedroom Farce, How the Other Half Loves and his children's plays as examples. The main effect is that the play reproduces the cinematic effect of cutting from one scene to another through use of lighting and mini sets.

It was written at a time when the news included reports of abuse of military prisoners in Iraq. Whilst there is only a passing reference in the play, and no direct mention made of the 2003 Iraq war, it forms part of the character of Dan, an ex-officer relieved of his commission through his failure to prevent a military scandal caused by the men under his command.

== Characters ==
There are six characters in the play, all of roughly equal prominence in the story. They are:

- Nicola, upper-middle-class woman
- Stewart, estate agent for Nicola
- Dan, Nicola's fiancé, an ex-army officer
- Ambrose, a hotel bartender, Dan's regular server
- Imogen, Stewart's sister, looking for true love
- Charlotte, Stewart's colleague, devout Christian with a murky past

The characters are in their thirties, except for Ambrose who is substantially older.

In addition, there is a seventh voice-only part of Arthur, Ambrose's abusive elderly father, who is only ever heard shouting from a room off-stage.

== Setting ==
In a set-up unusual for Alan Ayckbourn plays, the stage consists of several mini-sets: including a hotel bar, a desk, a sofa and a table, with many of the mini-sets representing different locations. There are a total of 54 "scenes", with instantaneous changes from one scene to another managed by fading lights from one mini-set to another, often supported by sound effects.

The play was performed in-the-round for its original run at the Stephen Joseph Theatre in 2004 and later at the Orange Tree Theatre in Richmond in 2005.

It was adapted for proscenium presentation for subsequent performance in New York. However, Alan Ayckbourn considered the play to be unsuited to larger theatres, to the point of eventually declining a transfer to a Broadway venue he considered too big.

The play runs for one continuous act with no interval. There is some confusion over the length of the productions. Reviews of the Stephen Joseph Theatre productions reported running times between 90 minutes and 110 minutes. However, the Stephen Joseph Theatre show reports gave a consistent running time averaging 107 minutes.

== Synopsis ==
When the play begins, Nicola is being guided through an unoccupied flat by Stewart, her estate agent, keen to make a sale. Stewart is unable to get Nicola's approval, chiefly because there is no suitable room to be used as a "study" for her fiancé, Dan. However, when Nicola returns to her current flat, she expresses frustration over Dan's insistence that their new flat must have a study. When challenged as to what Dan needs a study for, his reasons are rather flimsy, such as needing a room to quietly reflect and contemplate things. Nicola is also frustrated by Dan's lack of effort to find a job, and lack of housekeeping. Dan goes out drinking at a hotel bar where he is a regular, known by the bartender, Ambrose, with whom Dan shares his philosophy on women and how hard they are to please. It becomes clear that Dan has very little idea what to do with his life. He returns drunk, to Nicola's annoyance.

Stewart returns to the office and chats to his co-worker, Charlotte, with whom they share a very fond friendship, albeit a totally platonic one. Charlotte, openly a devout Christian frequently reading her Bible, lends Stewart a video of a programme she recorded, Songs That Changed My Life. Stewart agrees to please Charlotte, and returns home to the flat he shares with his sister, Imogen. After Imogen goes out for the evening, Stewart puts the video on. The programme is a religious one consisting exclusively of Christian songs that various obscure Christian figures find uplifting, and Stewart is barely interested – until the programme ends. Then the video returns to what was partly recorded over – a pornographic video – and Stewart watches in amazement. Imogen, in the meantime, spends the whole evening waiting for a date from a dating agency who fails to turn up. When Imogen returns home, both she and Stewart lie about what they have been doing that evening.

As an evening job, Charlotte starts working as a new carer for Ambrose's bed-ridden father, Arthur. Most of the previous minders have quit, and the reason soon becomes obvious: Arthur is ungrateful and rude, constantly shouting hurtful abuse at his minders, belittling their efforts to help him. Charlotte is no exception, and when she makes Arthur soup, she is rewarded by him throwing it in her face. In spite of this, Charlotte tries her best, drawing strength from her belief that to give in is giving in to the Devil.

At work, Ambrose again serves Dan, who had an argument with Nicola whilst viewing another flat. It now transpires that Dan used to have a promising career in the Army, but was dismissed after the men he was responsible for committed some undisclosed atrocity. Although Dan accepts that what his men did was wrong and, as the only officer present, he should carry the can, he appears to be in denial about his share of the responsibility. Vaguely referring to a past relationship, Ambrose suggests that the solution may be for Dan to, at least temporarily, meet other women. Dan returns home drunk again, and this time, the row escalates and Dan mentions they break up for a while, exactly how Ambrose suggested. Feigning indifference, Nicola accepts, saying she may also meet someone else.

Stewart nervously returns the video to Charlotte, paying her compliments, and Charlotte lends him another video. After Imogen leaves that evening, Stewart watches the video, but fast forwards through the faith programme. Like the last video, it then goes straight into the middle of a porn movie – only this time, Stewart finally realises that it is Charlotte in the video. However, Imogen (having this time lost her nerve completely and left a cafe abruptly) returns early and catching him watching the video, much to her disgust. The following day, Stewart returns the video to Charlotte, again dropping compliments, he tries to kiss her, but Charlotte backs away, so Stewart leaves in guilt.

Alone in the flat, Nicola burns, one by one, letters that Dan used to write her – letters that Imogen mentions elsewhere were beautiful letters from a much younger and inexperienced Dan she once knew. Far from the impression she gave the night they broke up, she cries as she burns the letters. Dan, meanwhile, has checked into the hotel whose bar he frequented so often. Dan confidently tells Ambrose he is making a new start, and already has a date lined up from the dating agency.

Imogen leaves her flat without even speaking to Stewart. It turns out her date is Dan and, amazingly, they hit it off instantly. Both use assumed names and Dan quite convincingly glosses over the bits of the past he is ashamed of, and yet confides that his father no longer speaks to him, and he can only visit his mother when he is not around. They drink until the hotel bar closes, and agree to see each other again. Imogen returns home happy and drunk, but hurtfully taunts a miserable Stewart for the video caught him watching, calling him a "greasy pornographer".

During her care visits, Charlotte talks about her religious beliefs to Ambrose. She believes strongly in all the vengeful parts of the Old Testament, but also in the forgiveness that comes later. Ambrose, for his part, reveals that his father was thrown out by his mother when he was young, and he only saw him again after his mother died – a possible atonement for his years of estrangement. Arthur's behaviour never improves, and he insults Charlotte for being ugly. Finally, on the third evening, Charlotte promises Arthur something he won't forget, and enters his room wearing a skimpy outfit looking mischievous. But as she leaves, she looks uneasy about what she has just done.

In the morning, Dan waits, with flowers ready for Imogen in his hotel bar. But before she arrives, Nicola finds him, having correctly guessed where to find him. They sit at a table, and although a reconciliation of sorts is achieved, it becomes clear there is no chance of a future together. Unfortunately, at this moment, Imogen enters and sees Dan sitting at a table, flowers resting there, talking to another woman. Imogen leaves distraught. Ambrose tells Dan she just left, but it is too late for Dan to catch up with her, and Dan knows no way of contacting her.

Stewart, having earlier heard from Nicola that she no longer needs a flat, tries to apologise to Charlotte, saying he will understand if she wishes to take the matter further. Charlotte responds by saying that, as a Christian, it is in her nature to forgive, and therefore she forgives him. But she adds that there is evil in all of them and Stewart must never do this again. Then, to bury the hatchet, she gives Stewart another video. Stewart takes the rest of the day off sick, and again fast forwards through the faith programme. This time, however, there is nothing after the programme but static, which Stewart sits watching.

When Charlotte calls for her minding, she finds Ambrose packing a suitcase for his father, rushed to hospital. He tells her than Arthur, whom she left sleeping soundly, had a heart attack later. With some embarrassment, Ambrose says that Arthur said strange things about her dancing naked, and other stuff he can't repeat. Ambrose talks about a close male friend in an old photograph Charlotte noticed, possibly implying Ambrose may be gay. As Charlotte departs, she leaves Ambrose a video.

In the final scene, Nicola packs her suitcases, Ambrose returning with his father's unpacked suitcase, Dan sits at the bar with his drink, Charlotte opens a folder at her desk, and Imogen joins Stewart on the sofa and they comfort each other. As Imogen switches off the TV, the play ends.

== Productions ==
The original production at the Stephen Joseph Theatre had its first performance on 12 August 2004, and an opening night on 17 August 2004, featuring the following cast:

- Nicola – Melanie Gutteridge
- Stewart – Paul Kemp
- Dan – Stephen Beckett
- Ambrose – Adrian McLoughlin
- Charlotte – Billie-Claire Wright
- Imogen – Sarah Moyle

The production team were:

- Director – Alan Ayckbourn
- Design – Pip Leckenby
- Lighting – Mick Hughes
- Costumes – Christine Wall
- Music – John Pattison

The production returned to the Stephen Joseph Theatre in 2005 for 11 performances before touring.

It was the first Ayckbourn production to be shown in London since Alan Ayckbourn threatened to boycott the West End following their treatment of Damsels in Distress two years previously. Even so, the company avoided the West End, instead performing the work in-the-round at the Orange Tree Theatre, in Richmond, which has close links with the Stephen Joseph Theatre in Scarborough.

This production, twenty minutes longer than the 2004 original, previewed at the Stephen Joseph from 21 to 30 April 2005 before opening at the Orange Tree on 5 May 2005. Most of the same cast and all of the same production team were used, the only differences being Paul Thornley replacing Stephen Beckett as Dan, and Alexandra Mathie replacing Billie Claire-Wright as Imogen.

The production was subsequently shown in New York at 59E59, opening on 9 June 2005, using the same cast and production team as the Richmond presentation. Following its commercial success, it was speculated the run would continue with an American cast, but the producers wanted to use a larger theatre and Alan Ayckbourn would not agree to this. As a result, the run ended.

The North West England premiere was staged by Chris Honer at the Library Theatre, Manchester in September 2006.

== Critical reviews ==
Reviews of the 2004 premiere were few and mixed, and none were archived in Theatre Record. This led to a negative review from Benedict Nightingale of The Times, once the play toured to the Orange Tree. He suggested the lack of reviewers at the Scarborough production was a sign of Alan Ayckbourn's decline.

However, all the other London critics covering the show penned favourable reviews for the Orange Tree presentation, including a five-star review in What's on in London, while Michael Billington in his review for The Guardian gave the production a four-star rating. John Thaxter for The Stage praised the production "for its superb construction and performances, sharp observation and an understated air of melancholy", while Fiona Mountford for The Evening Standard wrote: "Ayckbourn confirms himself once again as the master of understated emotion". The British Theatre Guide praised the "outstanding" performances of the six actors.

When the show reached New York the production also received a glowing review from Charles Isherwood of The New York Times. Following this the play enjoyed commercial success, featuring on a number of critics' top 10 events in 2005.

== Film adaptation ==
In 2006, the play was adapted into a French-language film Cœurs (billed as Private Fears in Public Places in North America), directed by Alain Resnais, who had previously adapted Alan Ayckbourn's Intimate Exchanges as Smoking/No Smoking. The film transplanted the story from Britain to Paris, and the scene changes were linked by falling snow. Some of the characters were renamed and there was a wider age difference than in the play. However, there was little change to the plot itself, and the dialogue remained entirely with the six onstage characters and one offstage character.

The film won the Silver Lion award for Best Director at the Venice Film Festival.
