= Rotherham Civic Theatre and Arts Centre =

Theatre in Rotherham, South Yorkshire, England

Coordinates: 53.4311°N 1.3518°W

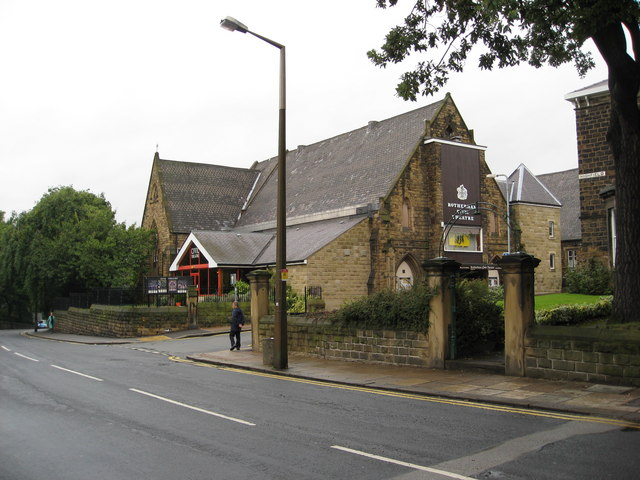
Rotherham Civic Theatre and Arts Centre

Rotherham Civic Theatre is a converted Congregational church in Rotherham, South Yorkshire, England which is now a medium-scale proscenium arch theatre playing host to a wide program of professional and amateur dance, drama, musicals, children's theatre, comedy, music and pantomime.
