= How the Other Half Loves =

1969 play by Alan Ayckbourn

- Original language: English
- Written by: Alan Ayckbourn
- Characters: Frank Foster; Fiona Foster; Bob Phillips; Teresa Phillips; William Featherstone; Mary Featherstone
- Subject: Marriage, infidelity, dysfunctional relationships

Premiere
- Date: 31 July 1969
- Place: Library Theatre, Scarborough
- Official website

How the Other Half Loves is a 1969 play in two acts by British playwright Alan Ayckbourn. It is a farce following the consequences of an adulterous affair between a married man and his boss's wife and their attempts to cover their tracks by roping in a third couple to be their alibi, resulting in a chain of misunderstandings, conflicts and revelations. The play is known to have secured Ayckbourn's runaway success as a playwright.

== Cast and plot summary ==
The play has a cast of six: Frank and Fiona Foster, Bob and Teresa Phillips, and William and Mary Featherstone. The well-to-do Frank and Fiona have a polite and emotionally distant relationship, while Fiona is in a secret affair with Frank's employee Bob, whose marriage with Teresa is very stormy; she feels neglected by him, and her suspicions are heightened by ghost phone calls. The contrast between the nature of the Fosters' and Phillips' relationships is heightened by the visual difference in their respective living spaces and furnishings, both of which co-exist in the same space on the stage. Asked where they have been, both Bob and Fiona lie to their spouses that they have been comforting, respectively, William and Mary Featherstone, each of whom is alleged to believe their spouse to be having an affair.

The Fosters and the Phillips have each invited the Featherstones to dinner on successive evenings, with both being played out simultaneously on the same set, the Featherstones shifting back and forth between them; William is revealed as a very controlling husband who systematically intimidates Mary. Teresa and Bob's conflict culminates in her throwing soup at him but mistakenly hitting William, while in the Fosters' dinner party, his drenched state is the result of a leak from the bathroom above.

Teresa, whose marriage with Bob is on the rocks, visits the Fosters and discovers Bob and Fiona's affair. In Teresa's absence, Mary visits the Phillips, and while Bob is in the next room, she answers a phone call from Frank, leading him to believe that she and Bob are having an affair. He tells William, who goes to the Phillips' house and physically attacks Bob but is knocked out by Teresa. After Frank invites everyone to his house to clear the air, William half-apologises to Mary, who chews him out over his controlling nature, but ultimately forgives him, while Bob and Teresa make up.

When they are alone, Frank forgives Fiona after she admits to having cheated. Although she does not reveal with whom, Frank thinks he has worked it out, and calls Bob, but Teresa answers. Assuming that he was the ghost caller, she suggests meeting him in private to discuss his problems, to which he bewilderedly agrees.

== Productions ==
How the Other Half Loves received its world première on 31 July 1969 at the Library Theatre., with the following cast:

- Frank Foster – Jeremy Franklin
- Fiona Foster – Elisabeth Sladen
- Bob Phillips – Colin Edwynn
- Teresa Phillips – Stephanie Turner
- William Featherstone – Brian Miller
- Mary Featherstone – Elizabeth Ashton

The creative team included:

- Director – Alan Ayckbourn
- Lighting – Peter Boden
- Stage Manager: Robin Holmes

Ahead of a West End transfer, producer Peter Bridge mounted a try-out with a different company at the Phoenix Theatre, Leicester, opening 19 March 1970 under director Robin Midgley. The production then opened in the West End at the Lyric Theatre on 5 August 1970, running over two years until September 1972, starring Robert Morley, Heather Sears, Joan Tetzel, Donald Burton, Brian Miller and Elizabeth Ashton, with several cast changes during the run.

The play reached Broadway at the Royale Theatre on 29 March 1971, directed by Gene Saks and running for 104 performances. The American cast was led by Phil Silvers and Sandy Dennis, with the Featherstone characters renamed "Detweiler" for US audiences.

Subsequent UK productions included a 1973 tour produced by Bill Kenwright; a 1976 revival by the Actors Company at Wimbledon Theatre; a 1988 revival at Greenwich Theatre that transferred to the Duke of York's Theatre in the West End; a 1998 tour opening at the Yvonne Arnaud Theatre, Guildford; and a 2007 tour by the Peter Hall Company. Ayckbourn returned to direct the play himself for a 2009 revival at his home venue, the Stephen Joseph Theatre, Scarborough. Later productions include a 2016 West End revival at the Theatre Royal Haymarket, a 2017 UK tour, and a 2026 revival at The Old Vic directed by Phillip Breen, starring Roger Allam and Dorothy Atkinson.
