= Absurd Person Singular =

Play written by Alan Ayckbourn

Absurd Person Singular is a 1972 play by Alan Ayckbourn. Divided into three acts, it documents the changing fortunes of three married couples. Each act takes place at a Christmas celebration at one of the couples' homes on successive Christmas Eves.

== Production history ==
The play made its world premiere at the Library Theatre, Scarborough on 26 June 1972 and its London début at the Criterion Theatre on 4 July 1973, transferring to the Vaudeville Theatre in September 1974, completing a run of 973 performances.

Its official New York Broadway début was at the Music Box Theatre on 8 October 1974. It ran for 591 performances in its first run on Broadway (through March 1976). It starred Richard Kiley, Geraldine Page, Sandy Dennis, Carole Shelley, Larry Blyden, and Tony Roberts. It was revived on Broadway on 18 October 2005 at the Biltmore Theatre, for 56 performances.

In 1994 James Maxwell directed a production for the Royal Exchange, Manchester with Trevor Cooper, Margo Gunn, Denys Hawthorne, Patrick O'Kane and Amanda Boxer.

The BBC produced a television drama, adapted from the play, first broadcast on 1 January 1985. It was directed by Michael Simpson and starred John Baddeley, Cheryl Campbell, Michael Gambon, Nicky Henson, Lesley Joseph, Maureen Lipman, Geoffrey Palmer and Prunella Scales.

The play was revived in the West End at the Whitehall Theatre, May 1990; and at the Garrick Theatre in December 2007.

A new production was staged during May 2011 at the new Curve Theatre in Leicester, starring Tracy-Ann Oberman and Louise Plowright and directed by Paul Kerryson.

The play was revived once again at the Stephen Joseph Theatre in Scarborough, 40 years after its original run there, in 2012.

The play returned to New York for a limited season in December 2019 with an all-British cast at Theatre Row, Off-Broadway. It was the first major revival in the city for almost fifteen years and transferred back to the UK in January 2020, at the Lawrence Batley Theatre, Huddersfield, in Ayckbourn's native county of Yorkshire. It was directed by John Cotgrave and starred Maria Sykes, Adam Elms, Claire Marlein, Alex Thompson, Eve Burley, and Joshua Nutbrown.

== Characters ==
=== Sidney ===
A contractor eager for social and professional advancement, Sidney will do anything to impress his perceived superiors—at the expense of his marriage. Sidney is socially inept, and shares that innocence with his wife, keeping their marriage together. As the play progresses, he becomes wealthier and wealthier, until eventually the friends he was once desperate to impress are now courting him as their own fortunes sink lower and lower. By the final act success has transformed Sidney's innocence into something approaching macabre sadism: in the earlier acts, the other couples view him with indulgent contempt and tolerate his childishness, but as the play progresses and he acquires money and power, they find themselves compelled to take him much more seriously, until self-preservation dictates they play along with his games.

=== Jane ===
Jane is the most sympathetic character in the play. Sidney's loyal wife, also in her 30s, she is not much brighter than he is, but is equally eager to please. Unlike Marion and Eva, she also has a knack for housework, in which she takes refuge from the complexities and difficulties of the world. She takes most of her social cues from her lover, and would do almost anything to help him succeed, but is not motivated by greed or social standing: she just wants a comfortable living and a happy family. In the final act, Jane seems to lose a sense of identity, parroting her husband's enthusiasm in his macabre party game. Like her husband, Jane also lacks sensitivity to others' feelings. Her habit of breaking into song when cleaning is also a clue that she is happiest when she is cleaning and that it is an escape from her real life. Jane represents the stereotypical TV commercial wife.

=== Geoffrey ===
An architect by trade, Geoffrey is initially on the way up, only to fall from grace after a design fails and collapses between the second and third acts. A confident man and something of a Jack-the-Lad, he has many casual affairs and could be said to flaunt it. His indifference towards his wife Eva may have led to her addiction to anti-depressants, and even to cause her suicide attempts in the second act. However, by the third act, he is an utterly broken man: his confidence and charisma have been dashed by his career grinding to a halt, and the prospect of Sidney being the last man on earth willing to hire him doesn't thrill him very much, either.

=== Eva ===
Geoffrey's wife. Eva's appearance in the first act is brief and whimsical, establishing only her addiction to anti-depressants and her difficulties with her husband Geoffrey. She comes into her own in the second act, as a very depressed Eva tries repeatedly to kill herself, growing more and more desperate to end it all even as the other characters prevent her from doing so. By the third act she has recovered, dispensed with her addiction to pain-killers, and appears to be teetotal (or at least a much lighter drinker, refusing alcohol even though she's not driving). She has also taken control of her relationship with Geoffrey, setting the course for his business and forcing him into situations he has typically charmed his way out of but which are now unavoidable. By the end of the play she is in perhaps the best position, being in control of her life and her relationship, neither warped by success nor embittered by failure, though she clearly has many practical challenges to overcome.

=== Ronald ===
An aging banker, Ronald takes pride in his work and enjoys the finer things in life. More conservative than the other characters, he is wry and sardonic. Initially both indulgent and disdainful of Sidney and Jane—although casually admiring Geoffrey—he is something of a side show in the second act and by the third act is clearly in severe financial trouble, unable to afford even to heat his house. Although he tries to maintain a facade of cheerful aristocratic bluster, his nerves show through, and he is forced to submit to Sidney as the holder of a large business account in Ronald's bank. (In fact, it is implied that Sidney is Ronald's only remaining significant client.)

=== Marion ===
Ronald's second wife is charming though snobbish and deeply eccentric. As the play advances more and more of her eccentricities are attributed to alcoholism, climaxing in her thoroughly drunk presence in the third act. Her main role in the play is to reflect and magnify the position of the taciturn Ronald, making his path from polite disdain of Sidney to impoverished failure more clearly elucidated than Ronald's naturally reserved personality would allow.
