= Malcolm Mowbray =

Film director (1949–2023)

- Born: 24 June 1949; Knebworth, England
- Died: 23 June 2023 (aged 73)
- Education: Ravensbourne College of Art and Design; National Film and Television School
- Occupation: Filmmaker
- Spouse: Valerie Hill (m. 1977; died 2006)
- Children: 2

Malcolm Mowbray (24 June 1949 – 23 June 2023) was a British screenwriter and director who worked in film and television.

== Background ==
Mowbray was born in Knebworth, Hertfordshire. His father was a dentist. He attended Sherrardswood School, Ravensbourne College of Art and Design, and the National Film and Television School.

== Career ==
Mowbray began his career in television, directing episodes of Premiere, BBC2 Playhouse, and Objects of Affection. In 1984, he turned to feature films with A Private Function. He directed and co-wrote with Alan Bennett, with whom he shared the Evening Standard British Film Award for Best Screenplay. He then moved to Los Angeles to continue working in film, though he returned to Britain by the 1990s. Additional credits include Crocodile Shoes, Out Cold, Cadfael, Pie in the Sky, Don't Tell Her It's Me, Sweet Revenge, and Monsignor Renard.

Following his final feature, Meeting Spencer, in 2011, he turned to academia. In 2016, he was named head of directing at the Northern Film School Leeds.

== Personal life ==
Mowbray married Valerie Hill in 1977. They first met when they were both students at Ravensbourne. The couple had two sons and were together until her death in 2006. Mowbray died from complications of dementia on 23 June 2023, the day before his 74th birthday.
