= Stephen Joseph Theatre =

Theatre in Scarborough, North Yorkshire, England

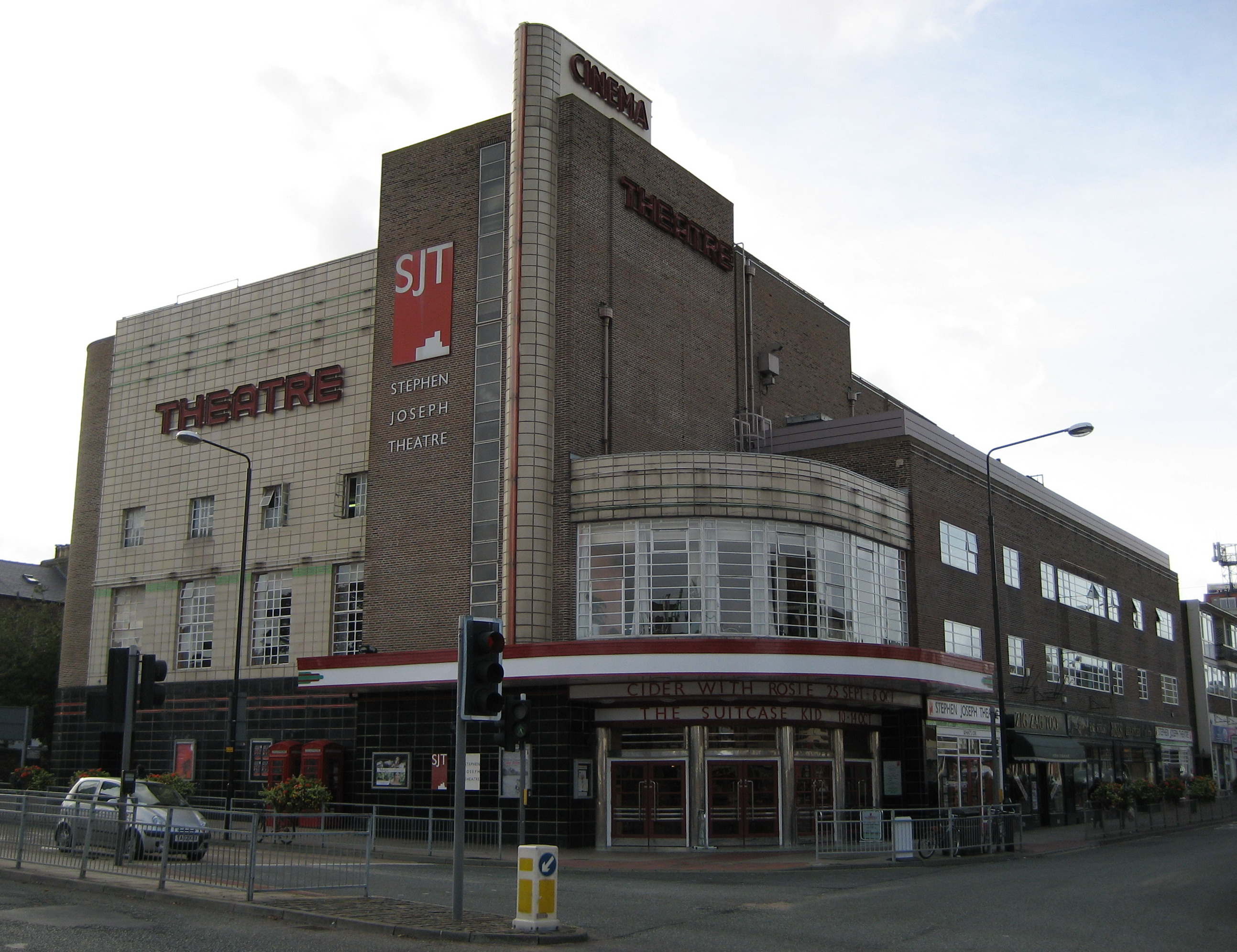
- Stephen Joseph Theatre
- Interactive map of Stephen Joseph Theatre
- Address: Westborough; Scarborough, North Yorkshire; England
- Coordinates: 54.280556°N 0.405833°W
- Owner: Scarborough Theatre Development Trust
- Capacity: 399-seat (main house); 165-seat (studio/cinema)
- Production: Visiting and own productions

Construction
- Opened: 30 April 1996

Website
- www.sjt.uk.com

The Stephen Joseph Theatre is a theatre in the round in Scarborough, North Yorkshire, England that was founded by Stephen Joseph and was the first theatre in the round in Britain.

In 1955, Joseph established a tiny theatre in the round on the first floor of Scarborough Library.

The theatre flourished and in 1976 moved to a supposedly temporary home on the ground floor of the former Scarborough Boys' High School.

However, a permanent home proved difficult to find and it was not until late 1988 and the closure of the local Odeon cinema by Rank Leisure that the theatre's long-standing Artistic Director, Alan Ayckbourn, found a suitable venue. Ayckbourn launched a £4 million appeal to transform the old cinema with a view to opening it up in 1995.

The new theatre, known simply as the Stephen Joseph Theatre, opened in 1996 and comprises two auditoria: The Round, a 399-seat theatre in the round, and The McCarthy, a 165-seat end-on stage/cinema. The building also contains a restaurant, shop, and full front-of-house and backstage facilities.

The Round boasts two important technical innovations: the stage lift, facilitating speedy set changes, and the trampoline, a Canadian invention which allows technicians particularly easy access to the lighting grid.

It is also the place where the image used for the cover of Richard Hawley's album Coles Corner was taken.

== Notable staff ==
- Chrissie Glazebrook, novelist
- Malcolm Hebden, associate director

== Patrons ==
- James Norton, actor

== See also ==
- Listed buildings in Scarborough (Castle Ward)
