= Snake in the Grass (play) =

2002 play by Alan Ayckbourn

- Written by: Alan Ayckbourn
- Characters: Annabel Chester; Miriam Chester; Alice Moody
- Original language: English
- Series: Things That Go Bump
- Subject: Ghosts, child abuse, domestic violence
- Genre: Black Comedy
- Setting: The garden of Chesters' house

Premiere
- Date premiered: 5 June 2002
- Place premiered: Stephen Joseph Theatre, Scarborough
- Official website

Snake in the Grass is a 2002 play by British playwright Alan Ayckbourn. The play is about a middle-aged older sister who returns to the family home where her younger sister still lives, shortly after their abusive father's death. It was written as a female companion piece to the 1994 ghost play Haunting Julia, and in 2008 these two plays, together with new play Life and Beth were folded into a trilogy named Things That Go Bump.

== Background ==
Ayckbourn's first "ghost" theme play, Haunting Julia, had a cast of three men, all haunted, in different ways, by the suicide of the daughter of one of the men. Subsequently, Ayckbourn had expressed a wish to write a female counterpart of this play. This was further encouraged by the continuing success of Stephen Mallatratt's adaptation of The Woman in Black (itself a heavy source of inspiration for Haunting Julia). The success of this play, along with Yasmina Reza's 'Art' also suggest that small-cast plays were becoming popular in commercial theatre.

A further factor was Ayckbourn's move towards more contemporary issues – in particular GamePlan, on the theme of teenage prostitution. This was the first play in the 2001 trilogy Damsels in Distress. The following year he wrote Snake in the Grass and it went one step further, with one of the characters a victim of sexual abuse as a child, although this is never explicitly stated in the play, only implied. The older sister is a victim of domestic violence.

There are a few notable differences to Haunting Julia. In Haunting Julia, a father is haunted by his dead daughter, whilst in Snake in the Grass the two daughters are haunted by their father, and for very different reasons. The supernatural scenes are far less prevalent; in Haunting Julia, the play climaxes in an appearance of the ghost of Julia, but in Snake in the Grass, there is much less clarity as to which "ghosts" are real ghosts, which are metaphorical ghosts in the sisters' minds, and which events are not ghosts at all but staged hoaxes. However, the play is, if anything, a considerably darker play than Haunting Julia.

== Characters ==
There are three female characters in the play, they are:

- Annabel Chester, fifty, was a successful married business woman, now divorced and her business collapsed;
- Miriam Chester, forty-four, Annabel's younger sister, eternally house-bound to her late father's house;
- Alice Moody, nurse for Annabel and Miriam's father shortly before his death (aged forty in the published script, but the character in the 2008 revival was younger).

There is also a small voice-only part of a man's voice (unclear whether it is the voice of the Chesters' father or just someone imitating it) towards the end of the play, whispering the names of the two daughters. Like Julia in Haunting Julia, the father in this play can be considered a very strong off-stage character.

== Setting ==
The entire play takes place in the garden of the Chesters' family home, now neglected and run-down. Included in the scene is the edge of an overgrown tennis court and a summer house built over a disused well, both of which play important roles during play.

Unlike Haunting Julia, written to run as a single scene with no interval, there are three scenes in this play. The first act has two scenes, both set in the late afternoon on consecutive days. The second act has a longer scene, running into the night of the second day. This was modelled on the idea of "a thriller that starts in sunlight in a garden, and slowly the darkness comes in as the sun sets."

This play was written specifically for the round, unlike Haunting Julia that was written for the proscenium but sometimes staged in the round for various practical reasons. The original 2002 production shared its set with a revival on Ayckbourn's 1978 play Joking Apart, also set in a garden, so there are some similarities between the sets of the two plays. (The 2008 revival, in contrast, did not share a set with either of the other two Things That Go Bump plays, with the other two plays set in very different indoor locations.)

== Synopsis ==
Annabel Chester, a stressed businesswoman, enters the garden for the first time after running away aged twelve. She is met by Alice Moody, the nurse to Annabel's late father. After some short-lived pleasantries and some curt references to Annabel's ex-marriage, Alice states she was dismissed by her sister, Miriam, not for inefficiency as Annabel believes, but because she was trying to stop Miriam finishing her father off. These claims are backed up by a letter from their father expressing his fears, and, knowing the will was changed in Annabel's favour, Alice demands £100,000 in compensation. Ignoring Annabel's threats to go to the police for blackmail, she promises to return tomorrow.

For a moment, the tennis court shakes strangely – the first of several times in the play. Miriam appears, dressed in ill-fitting dowdy clothes. She concedes to Annabel that she removed "Just one or two lights" and gave her father "just a little push" and increased the dose of medicine "just three or four times" – and when she reveals she was treated as a slave her whole life after Annabel left, the motive is clear: no life or friends of her own allowed, and just the odd chance to do courses in, somewhat obscurely, electrics and plumbing.

In scene two, Annabel, has decided that they can afford to give Alice £5,000 and no more, seemingly indifferent to the alternative that the police will exhume the body, find the traces of medicine and send Miriam to jail. Miriam, however, insists on trying to sweeten Alice up by offering her some wine in a summer house built over an old well. Annabel has a seizure at the sight of it – after her marriage to her violent husband collapsed, and her business with it, she drank herself to a heart attack. As they wait, they remember their times in the garden: Annabel in the tennis court, pelted with balls by her father, and Miriam's brief relationship with a man called "Lewis", ended by her disapproving father.

Alice arrives and takes the wine, and sees through Annabel's offer almost immediately. With Annabel refusing to offer any more, Miriam, in apparent desperation, suggests Lewis could find the money. Alice scorns this too, and, before leaving to go to the police, stops to tell Miriam has one hell of a sister ... but before she can finish, she collapses. Miriam says she drugged the wine (her own glass having come from a different bottle in the kitchen), and a horrified Annabel watches her push Alice's body through the trapdoor and down the well. Next, she goes through Alice's handbag looking for the letter. It is not there, but her address and keys are, so she persuades Annabel to come with her to get the letter. Before Annabel leaves, she takes one last look at the tennis court, a tennis ball flies out of nowhere, and she screams.

In the second act, with all lighting but the storm lanterns failed, they return. Annabel notices the letter is forged, meaning they killed Alice for nothing. Annabel thinks she hears some scratching from the well. Miriam look down and says Alice must be dead, but Annabel's anxiety increases further. Miriam starts telling of the spooky things that used to happen, saying "Who's coming up the stairs?" and "Who's going to kiss you goodnight" and starts on a "ghost story". Twelve years old, she sneaked out of the house to go to a party with, in her father's words, "unsavoury youths", partied away in a silver dress and got propositioned by three boys she didn't fancy. When she returned, her father was waiting in the garden for his disobedient daughter, he would have to "punish" Miriam said she chose to be punished in the garden over indoor, but the punishment was worse ... before she finishes with "Wasn't that a good ghost story!"

Miriam forces Annabel to confront her own fear of entering the tennis court, and when Annabel tries to return indoors, she finds a soaking scarf that belonged to Alice. Miriam then forces a now hugely stressed Annabel to tell her own "ghost story" of her marriage, insisting she needs to know now. So Annabel talks of how they met at a sales conference; how they saw films together, her liking romantic comedies, him liking violent blockbusters; how they started sleeping together and married to formalise the arrangement; how one day he snapped over something trivial and hit her; how sweet he was when he apologised afterwards; how distant he grew the rest of the time; how she ended up provoking him to get his attention this way. Miriam asks if she enjoyed being hit, adding that she doesn't know any more if she enjoyed what happened to her. She muses the people you hurt most are the people you love, and before returning indoors, says to Annabel: "I love you".

As soon as Miriam leaves, the lights go out. Annabel stumbles over to the tennis court, and hears her father whispering "Annabel ... Annabel ..." before being pelted with tennis balls. Then, a soaking and bedraggled Alice emerges from the well. This is finally enough to give Annabel a fatal heart attack. Miriam comes back, checks Annabel's pulse, and she and Alice (or "Lewis", as Miriam now calls her) celebrate the success of their plan to reclaim the inheritance. The father voice was just a tape recorder, the tennis balls came from a machine, the well was filled in years ago, and the two show every sign that they are in fact a lesbian couple. When Alice shows how keen she is to sell the family home, Miriam sends Alice to switch on the lights.

Left alone with her sister (whom they plan to "find" dead in the morning), Miriam says "Goodbye sister". Then there is a flash of light from the house (Miriam's training in plumbing and electrics put to use), and she says "Whoops" and "Goodbye Lewis". Then, wearing the silver dress from the party, she is about to celebrate, when the lights come on by themselves, her father chair starts rocking and her father's voice whispers "Miriam ... Miriam ..." The play ends as Miriam screams.

== Productions ==
Programme cover for the 2008 revival as part of Things That Go Bump

The original production at the Stephen Joseph Theatre had its first performance on 30 May 2002, and an opening night on 5 June 2002 1994, featuring the following cast:

- Annabel – Fiona Mollison
- Miriam – Susie Blake
- Alice – Rachel Atkins

The production team were:

- Director – Alan Ayckbourn
- Design – Roger Glossop
- Lighting – Mick Hughes
- Costume – Christine Wall
- Music – John Pattinson

The play was performed in the round, in repertory with a revival of Ayckbourn's 1978 play Joking Apart. Both plays toured to three other theatres in the round in September and October of that year. The following year, in January and February, Snake in the Grass toured alone to four further end-stage theatres.

Since then, the play has gone on to become one of the most frequently performed Ayckbourn plays, with six professional productions between 2005 and 2007. The play has also been particularly popular with amateur groups.

The play had its American Premiere in 2005 at The Black River Playhouse, Chester, New Jersey, directed by Michael T. Mooney. The cast included Cody Dalton, Julianne DiPietro-Renshaw and Beth Amiano Gleason.

In 2008, it was revived by the Stephen Joseph Company, along with its originating play Haunting Julia as part of a trilogy named Things That Go Bump, with a new third play, Life and Beth, that combined the casts of the two plays. Susie Blake reprised her role as Miriam. The other two roles were played by Liza Goddard as Annabel and Ruth Gibson as Susie.

== Critical Review ==
The reviews for Snake in the Grass were generally positive, particularly about the acting. and Ayckbourn's writing for women The most praise was given to Susie Blake as Miriam. The Financial Times review said: "Along with her perfect timing, phrasing, and connection to her stage colleagues, she has bubbliness, impishness, and a certain perpetual inner childlike innocence. But she is way past childhood now ... the younger daughter who had to remain at home to tend a monstrous father. In this role, Blake shows us what she can be when her bubbliness is popped, when her impishness turns dangerous; and when her childlike innocence has withered in the bud.". Alfred Hickling, for The Guardian drew comparisons to Haunting Julia but commended the play for its focus on ghosts in the mind, and said the play "... surprisingly ends up having more in common with Hamlet than Gaslight." John Sherborne for Plays International praised the collaboration between Designer Roger Glossop and Lighting Designer Mick Hughes.

The reviews did, however, stop short of proclaiming it one of Ayckbourn's best plays. In spite of the praise for Susie Blake, the Financial Times review felt the twists were familiar when they came, and the characters' inflexions becoming tedious. Dominic Cavendish for The Daily Telegraph, although broadly positive of the play itself, criticise Ayckbourn for allowing the Stephen Joseph Theatre's programme to be dominated by his work.

The 2008 revival also enjoyed positive reviews.
