= Things That Go Bump (plays) =

Alan Ayckbourn trilogy performed in 2008

Things that go Bump (trilogy)
- Promotional image used in newspaper adverts
- Original language: English
- Written by: Alan Ayckbourn
- Characters: Joe Lukin / David Ken Chase / Gordon Andy Rollinson / Martin Annabel Chester / Beth Miriam Chester / Connie Alice Moody / Ella
- Subject: Various, all involving ghosts
- Genre: Various
- Setting: Various

Premiere
- Date: 27 May 2008 (Haunting Julia), 10 June 2008 (Snake in the Grass), 22 July 2008 (Life and Beth)
- Place: Stephen Joseph Theatre, Scarborough
- Official website

Things That Go Bump is a season of plays (often regarded as a trilogy) performed in 2008 by British playwright Alan Ayckbourn.

Unlike Ayckbourn's previous trilogies, where all three plays were written for the same season, the three plays in this set were written over a period of fourteen years. The first play, Haunting Julia, was written in 1994, and Snake in the Grass was written in 2002 as a companion piece. Finally, in 2008, a third play, Life and Beth, was written combining the six actors in the other two plays, and all three plays were performed as a trilogy at the Stephen Joseph Theatre. The plays shared the themes of ghosts, but the stories and characters themselves were unconnected.

== Background ==
Further details in background sections on individual Haunting Julia, Snake in the Grass and Life and Beth pages.

The history of the trilogy began in 1994, when the Stephen Joseph Theatre was still at its old Westwood site. Haunting Julia was written following inspiration from Stephen Mallatratt's stage adaptation of Susan Hill's The Woman in Black, and premièred at the theatre seven years earlier. His interest came from what he considered Mallatratt's ability to make audiences jump through good acting and tension rather than special effects. However, Haunting Julia ended up being dominated by the three living men and their relationship to Julia – a brilliant musician who took her life aged nineteen – rather than the appearances of any ghosts.

After a première with mixed success in 1994 and a more successful revival in 1999, now at the theatre's current site, Ayckbourn followed this play up in 2002 with Snake in the Grass. This was partly due to a wish to write a female equivalent of Julia, partly due to the continuing success of The Woman in Black, and partly due to the success that Yasmina Reza's play 'Art' was enjoying with a small cast. Mirroring the original play, Snake featured three women, and the "ghost" was the father of two of them. However, in keeping with Ayckbourn's tendency to move more contemporary themes, the play was arguably a much darker one, covering themes of sexual abuse and domestic violence.

For some time afterwards, Ayckbourn considered writing a third ghost play that would combine the cast of the previous two plays, and eventually decided to do so after Susie Blake (Miriam in the original Snake in the Grass) asked about reprising her role. It was announced in December 2007 that the play would be performed as part of next summer's season, and two months later it was added that Ayckbourn's other two "ghost" plays would also be performed as a trilogy, now known as Things That Go Bump. Although Things That Go Bump was a name created by the Stephen Joseph Theatre for its 2008 season rather than one created by Alan Ayckbourn, the three plays have since been regarded as a trilogy elsewhere.

Alan Ayckbourn himself did not express any opinions on the existence of ghosts, but he say he once felt the presence of his father's ghost a few years after his death. Whether this affected the plays is unclear.

== Characters ==
The first two plays each have three characters: all-male in the first, and all-female in the second.. In the 2008 season, the twelve characters were cast as follows:

Actor in 2008 Season	Actor required	Haunting Julia	Snake in the Grass	Life and Beth
Ian Hogg	Male, older	Joe Lukin	(Father)	David
Adrian McLoughlin	Male, older	Ken Chase	–	Gordon
Richard Stacey	Male, younger	Andy Rollinson	–	Martin
Liza Goddard	Female, older	–	Annabel Chester	Beth
Susie Blake	Female, older	–	Miriam Chester	Connie
Ruth Gibson	Female, younger	(Julia)	Alice Moody	Ella

Note: Ruth Gibson and Ian Hogg can be loosely attributed to Julia and the Chesters' father respectively, as their pictures were used to represent the two ghosts on the programmes and publicity for Haunting Julia and Snake in the Grass. However, they played no part in the actual productions, and in the case of Haunting Julia, the voice of the actress in the original 1994 production, Cathy Sara, was re-used.

== Setting ==
All three plays are single-set plays, but unlike earlier trilogies (The Norman Conquests and Damsels in Distress), there was no connection between either the set or the location of the play. The time-frame of the plays vary, with Haunting Julia taking place in a single interval-free scene over two hours, Life and Beth running from evening to morning over Christmas Eve, and Snake in the Grass, the longest, running from one afternoon to very late the following day.

Haunting Julia went through the most changes with the setting over its première and revivals, with an interval added and removed again; and written for the proscenium but staged in the round, then re-staged in the proscenium and then the round again. The trilogy in its final form was produced entirely in the round, but all three of the plays have been (individually) performed for the end-stage at various stages in their respective tours.

== The Plays ==
=== Haunting Julia ===
The first play, originally written in 1994, Haunting Julia, is set in the "Julia Lukin Music Centre" in an exhibit reproducing the room of Julia, a gifted musician who unexpectedly took her life aged nineteen. Twelve years after the event, Julia's father, Joe, brings along Julia's old boyfriend (or, more accurately, unrequited admirer). With Joe never accepting Julia's death as suicide and determined to believe she lives on as a ghost, and Andy (now married with children) wanting to forget it and move on, Joe brings along Ken Chase, a man who claims to be a psychic, in a bid to contact her. Ken is later discovered to be the former janitor in Julia's house, and between the three of them, the truth gradually emerges as to why Julia really took her life. And as they talk about it, more and more unexplained events occur which seem to suggest Julia is still around.

=== Snake in the Grass ===
Snake in the Grass, written in 2002 as a companion piece to Haunting Julia, reversed the sexes, changing the three male characters for three female characters and the ghost of a young woman for that of an old (and much less pleasant) man. It is also portrays "ghosts" far more in the metaphorical context of past events rather than supernatural beings. In the play, Annabel Chester returns to her family home she fled when fifteen to receive the inheritance from her father. She is blackmailed by her father's old nurse, Alice Moody, who claims to have evidence that Annabel's house trapped sister, Miriam, overdosed his medicine. Miriam's method of dealing with this, however, is to drug Alice and push her down the garden well. After the sisters destroy the evidence, the terrible truths about their pasts emerge, as does the true extent of a sinister plot.

=== Life and Beth ===
The final play that combined the two casts, Life and Beth, was written in 2008. Much more like a comedy than the other two plays, it is also the only play of the three where the ghost is played by a character on stage (although it is never quite clear whether this was a real ghost or just a figment of Beth's imagination). It is set over the first Christmas Eve that Beth spends after her husband's death, where her self-pitying alcohol sister-in-law, Connie, her son Martin, and lovesick vicar David all doing their utmost to help her through it. In fact, however, Beth doesn't miss her husband, Gordon, that much, as he was a pedantic and tedious man who micromanaged her life, while Martin has inherited all of the wrong attributes of Gordon, as evidenced by his silent morose girlfriend Ella. It is only when a prayer of David's inadvertently brings the ghost of Gordon back to Earth that things get complicated.

== Productions ==
In the Things That Go Bump season, Haunting Julia premiered at the Stephen Joseph Theatre on 27 May 2008, followed by Snake in the Grass on 22 July 2008 and Life and Beth on 22 July 2008. The production team was:

- Director (Haunting Julia) – Richard Derrington
- Director (Snake in the Grass and Life and Beth) – Alan Ayckbourn
- Design – Pip Leckenby
- Lighting – Kath Geraghty
- Music – John Pattinson

The three plays then toured to the New Vic, Newcastle-under-Lyme in September. In 2009, Life and Beth was re-directed for the end-stage and toured alone to six other theatres.

== Critical Reviews ==
Further details in review sections on individual Haunting Julia, Snake in the Grass and Life and Beth pages.

The original reviews of Haunting Julia were divided, partly along the lines of those who welcomed Ayckbourn's progression into more dramatic plays and those who preferred his older formula. One thing that may not have helped was that it was a play written for the proscenium that was staged in the round, and consequently a crucial door was invisible to some of the audience. In the 1999 revival, where and end-stage production was possible, and in 2008, which was staged in the round again but the door was changed into a trapdoor, the reviews were better.

Snake in the Grass's 2002 reviews were generally positive, with, this time, Ayckbourn's move into more contemporary themes being welcomed by the reviewers.

In the Things That Go Bump trilogy in 2008, the most attention in the reviews went to Life and Beth. This was also received positively, although there was disappointment from some that the tension from the earlier two plays was not repeated here.
