= Sugar Daddies (play) =

2003 play by Alan Ayckbourn

- Original language: English
- Written by: Alan Ayckbourn
- Characters: Sasha; Val; Chloe; Ashley; Charmaine
- Subject: Self-delusion, crime
- Genre: Comedy
- Setting: Sasha's flat

Premiere
- Date: 23 July 2003
- Place: Stephen Joseph Theatre, Scarborough
- Official website

Sugar Daddies is a 2003 play by British playwright Alan Ayckbourn. It is about a student who forms a friendship with a rich man over three times her age, who has a sinister past, and maybe a sinister present too.

== Background ==
Ayckbourn wrote Sugar Daddies in early 2003, shortly after concluding his family play The Jollies and shortly before starting rehearsals for Tim Firth's The Safari Party. In some respects, it can be considered a follow-on from the Damsels in Distress trilogy. It again features a young female leading character in some kind of danger, and shares the theme of East End crime that frequently arose throughout the trilogy. The original productions also shared Alison Pargeter as one of the leading roles, but this had influence far beyond making Sugar Daddies a companion piece.

Prior to acting at the Stephen Joseph Theatre, Alison Pargeter had concentrated her career on playing children and teenagers. Indeed, her first role working with Ayckbourn was as a nine-year-old girl in his new family musical Whenever in 2000. The following year, she played a 16-year-old in GamePlan, the older heroine in FlatSpin, and, finally, an ex-lapdancer in RolePlay – three roles that earned her Best Newcomer in the Critics' Circle Awards. Having seen her take on the different range of ages successfully, Ayckbourn chose to write a role specifically combining all of her traits into one character. Although Ayckbourn has previously written plays with a specific set of actors in mind (the most recent example being RolePlay, written during rehearsals for two of the Damsels in Distress plays), the practice of writing for a specific actor was very unusual, and this play is regarded as the closest Ayckbourn has come to creating a role for an individual.

The role chosen for Sasha, Alison Pargeter's character, concentrated heavily on the theme of self-delusion. Ayckbourn equated it to French dramatist Jean Anouilh's theme of innocence being gradually corrupted. To some extent, the same theme of deception and self-deception applies to the other four characters, particularly Val, the old man Sasha befriends, whose dark past he is unable to hide for long.

== Characters ==
There are five characters in the play:

- Sasha, friendly student, early twenties, studying catering
- Val, former gangster and pimp, now in his seventies
- Chloe, Sasha's half-sister, mid-thirties, TV researcher, personality opposite of Sasha
- Ashley, former police officer and Val's nemesis, also now in his seventies
- Charmaine, former "exotic", now a "designer", fifties/sixties.

Sasha is the central character. The other supporting characters make appearances throughout the play, apart from Charmaine who only appears for part of the second act.

== Setting ==
The entire play takes place in Sasha and Chloe's flat. Although there is no change of location in the play, between the first and second act, the entire flat is refurbished to something expensive yet hideous, with little resemblance to the original set.

The play takes place over two acts. The first act takes place over a period of about two weeks. The second act takes place several weeks after the first, and takes place over a few days.

It was performed in the round for its original production at the Stephen Joseph Theatre, and adapted for the proscenium for subsequent performances elsewhere.

== Synopsis ==
The play begins with Sasha helping into her flat an old man, Val, dressed as Father Christmas. He was hit by a car near a children's hospital where he was doing his good deed for the year. Sasha came from Norfolk two months ago to study catering, with the hope of running a restaurant she sings in. For now, however, she washes dishes at the Dorchester Hotel. Val, meanwhile, claims to be retired from the serious crime squad. But the paranoia he has over who ran him over, and tone of a phone call to his nephew, Frankie, suggests that he is more of a gangster.

When Chloe, Sasha's older half-sister, arrives home, she is horrified that Sasha let a stranger into her house. Before and after Val leaves, Chloe shows stress through her job as a TV researcher, the imminently rising rent, and her boyfriend who calls off dates by text message. Then a beautiful bunch of flowers arrive at the door. But they are not to Chloe from Zack, but instead to Sasha from "Uncle Val".

In scene two, two weeks later, Sasha enjoys a beautiful new dress, a ride in a Rolls-Royce, tickets to the Royal Opera House with Val to see The Flying Dutchman – all supposedly obtained cheaply through people Val knows. Also, the rent is mysteriously not rising after all. Chloe is starting to wonder, but right now is preparing for a candlelit dinner with Zack. However, shortly after Sasha and Val leave, Chloe receives the text message she feared.

Later that night, in scene 3, Sasha returns to find Chloe drunk and unconscious. Fearing she is dead, she shouts for help, and a man with an eye patch arrives. He is Ashley, the new neighbour downstairs. After helping Sasha get Chloe to bed, Ashley assumes (owing to a misunderstanding of the phrase "working girls") they are both prostitutes. He also claims to be retired from the serious crime squad, and blames the loss of his eye on a car chase, and before leaving tells Sasha he is looking out for her.

In the next scene, two days later, Sasha is further spoiled more gifts bought cheaply through Val's "contacts" – mostly women who (in Sasha's eyes) Val took care of. She also looks set to get a job in a nightclub. Ashley then calls with the news that Zack is in hospital, having fallen victim to muggers who stuck his mobile phone up his bottom (to some embarrassment when Chloe rang him). With Sasha out of the room, the two men confront each other. Ashley is, in fact, on a lifelong quest to put Val behind bars. Val was no policeman but instead a pimp, and the women who Val set up are the ones who survived. Ashley warns Val not to harm her. Val muses that the flat could do with some new furniture.

At the start of Act Two, several weeks later, the flat is transformed into something expensive yet devoid of character. Sasha, too, is becoming something expensive and without character. Ashley helps Sasha move in the final few things, and tries again to warn her about Val, but Sasha is adamant she won't permit them to say nasty things about each other.

When Chloe returns (having spent a holiday with Zack in Mallorca to recover from the accident), she exclaims that the place has been turned into a brothel. Snapping, she calls Val a dirty old man, tells Sasha she will pay for her "gifts" eventually and declares she will live in a hotel until the furniture is gone. Sasha retorts by highlighting Chloe's unreciprocated devotion to Zack, calls her a failure, and throws Chloe's present (a cheap Mallorcan pot) after her as she leaves.

In the next scene, Sasha prepare a dinner party for Val, Ashley and the "designer" Sasha used, Charmaine (one of Val's "proteges"). Ashley and Val have agreed a truce for the evening, but Val still privately reminds Val that he really lost his eye in a drunken darts match, and that his obsession with Val cost him his marriage. After Charmaine arrives, Sasha mentions she is considering dropping out of catering college and running a nightclub instead, or some other higher ambition. She says it's all thanks to Val, who shows signs that he is truly growing fond of her.

But in the next scene, after the dinner, Sasha feels excluded as Val, Ashley and Charmaine, none of whom liked her cooking that much, reminisce with stories of old times. Sensing this, Val persuades Sasha to sing. She manages a good classical rendition of Nobody's Heart Belongs to Me, which moves Val and Ashley. Charmaine, however, has treated Sasha like a trainee prostitute all evening, and belittles her for being unsexy. Val loses his temper, and showing a frightening side not seen before, orders her out. With Sasha out of the room, the truce breaks down and Val and Ashley fight, only to do more damage to themselves than each other. Then Sasha takes a phone call, and hears that Chloe fell in front of a train.

In the final scene, Sasha clears up with a sedated Chloe in her bedroom. Ashley calls first to say that he and Val reached an agreement to find different planets to live on. Then Val calls, and even though Chloe's fall was clearly an accident, Val still denies involvement. Sasha tells Val they have to stop this, saying that although she enjoyed it, she really knew all along the side she didn't want to see. Finally, Chloe emerges, tired of small hotel rooms and warming to some of the less ghastly furniture. The fact that Zack did not visit her in hospital finally persuades her this, too, must end. So when flowers arrive at the door, without checking who they are for, they both refuse them.

== Productions ==
The original production at the Stephen Joseph Theatre had its first performance on 17 July 2003, and an opening night on 23 July 2003, featuring the following cast:

- Sasha – Alison Pargeter
- Val – Rex Garner
- Chloe – Anna Brecon
- Ashley – Terence Booth
- Charmaine – Eliza Hunt

The production team were:

- Director – Alan Ayckbourn
- Design – Roger Glossop
- Lighting – Mick Hughes
- Costumes – Christine Wall

Between September 2003 and February 2004, the production toured to eight venues in England. This was the first Ayckbourn production to begin touring after the debacle over the Duchess Theatre's handling of the Damsels in Distress trilogy which led to Ayckbourn's threat of a West End "boycott". Shortly before touring, Ayckbourn was reported to say that he would consider returning to the West End on condition that he kept control over the production, and this led to speculation that Sugar Daddies would be shown in the West End. But this did not happen, and the closest performance to London was at the Yvonne Arnaud Theatre in Guildford, the Stephen Joseph Theatre preferring to set up partnerships with regional theatres on Ayckbourn's own terms.

The first professional production since the tour was at The Mill in Sonning, Berkshire.

Beginning 4 October and running through early November 2013, ACT (A Contemporary Theatre) produced the play in Seattle, Washington. The cast was:

- Sasha – Emily Chisholm
- Val – Seán G. Griffin
- Chloe – Elinor Gunn
- Ashley – John Patrick Lowrie
- Charmaine – Anne Allgood

The production team were:

- Director – Alan Ayckbourn
- Scenic Design – Matthew Smucker
- Lighting – Rick Paulsen
- Costumes – Deb Trout

Ayckbourn directed the first two performances.

== Critical reviews ==
The reviews of Sugar Daddies were broadly positive. Michael Billington of The Guardian wrote: "... the real fascination lies in watching Ayckbourn's transformation from social observer to impassioned moralist, alarmed at our declining sense of self and loss of personal identity", although he felt the ending was a little too sugary. Dominic Cavendish of The Daily Telegraph saw some of the moments in Sasha and Val's relationship as decidedly Pinteresque.

Alison Pargeter received all-round compliments for her performance as Sasha. Jeremy Kingston of The Times wrote of her performance: "Her response to compliments becomes tarty. She not only waits for them, she poses in readiness. There is much of the child to her, but she also has the child's straight perception." The following year, she landed a major adult role as "Stalker" Sarah Cairns in EastEnders.
