= Haunting Julia =

1994 play by Alan Ayckbourn

- Original language: English
- Written by: Alan Ayckbourn
- Characters: Joe Lukin; Andy Rollinson; Ken Chase
- Series: Things That Go Bump
- Subject: Ghosts, suicide
- Genre: Drama
- Setting: The Julia Lukin Music Centre

Premiere
- Date: 1 December 1994
- Place: Stephen Joseph Theatre (Westwood), Scarborough
- Official website

Haunting Julia is a 1994 play by British playwright Alan Ayckbourn. It is about Julia Lukin, a nineteen-year-old brilliant musician who committed suicide twelve years earlier, who haunts the three men closest to her, through both the supernatural and in their memories. In 2008, it was presented as the first play of Things That Go Bump (2002 play Snake in the Grass and new play Life and Beth being parts two and three).

== Background ==
The inspiration for Haunting Julia came the stage adaptation of The Woman in Black, written by Susan Hill, adapted for the stage by Stephen Mallatratt. It premièred at the Stephen Joseph Theatre (then at the Westwood site) in 1987, directed by Alan Ayckbourn's co-director, Robin Herford, whilst Ayckbourn was on sabbatical at the Royal National Theatre, London. He considered that the ability to make audiences jump was little to do with special effects and a lot to do with acting and a tense storyline. This idea grew into Haunting Julia, performed seven years later. However, as Ayckbourn acknowledged, although the play remained a ghost story, the theme that grew to dominate the play were three men, and their relationships to Julia, a gifted musician who took her life aged nineteen.

The departure from a straight ghost story may also have been down to Ayckbourn wishing to explore the conventions of the ghost story format rather than ghosts themselves. Ayckbourn deliberately sought to keep the character of Julia as one that ordinary teenage girls could relate to, in particular the way that ordinary parents push their children to achieve things on their behalf. Her character was also influenced by gifted people having little concept of the needs of others, like a "slight autism" – a characteristic Alan Ayckbourn said he slightly shares. Nonetheless, Ayckbourn said he once felt the presence of his father's ghost in Scarborough a few years after his death.

This play has the unique characteristic of being the only Ayckbourn play to have been written for the proscenium but premièred in the round. At the time of writing the play, it was planned that the Stephen Joseph Theatre would have moved to its new (and present-day) site at the old Odeon cinema, where there would be both a round and an end-stage theatre available. However, it turned out the new theatre was not ready until 1996. An idea to open the end-stage theatre concurrently with the existing theatre in the round was considered and quickly rejected, and Ayckbourn decided to go ahead with Haunting Julia at the current site as Westwood.

== Characters ==
There are three male characters in the play, they are:

- Joe Lukin, Julia's father, now in his sixties, never lets his daughter go, convinced there are unanswered questions about her death;
- Andy Rollinson, generally considered Julia's student boyfriend, but unrequited admirer would be a more accurate description, now in his thirties;
- Ken Chase, a gentle unassuming man in his forties who offers his service as a psychic to Joe, later discovered to have once been the janitor in Julia's house.

There are also two voice parts in the play: one of Julia (or, more accurately, an actress imitating her voice speaking words the real Julia would probably never have said), and a sombre male voice talking about her death.

It was originally intended that Joe would be the central character of the story, but Ayckbourn eventually considered the central character of the story to be Julia herself. He also considered two other offstage characters – Dolly, Joe's late wife, and Kay, the woman Andy married instead of Julia – to be strong characters.

== Setting ==
The entire play takes place in the Julia Lukin Music Centre, an uneasy mixture between a public music facility and shrine from Joe to his daughter. The room in question is Julia's room as a student (albeit a far more tidy version than the real Julia's room), now with a walkway installed for public viewing.

In a format used only the second time in a full-length Ayckbourn play, Haunting Julia is a 'real-time' play (Absent Friends being the first), with a single continuous scene running throughout the whole play. It was intended that the entire play would be performed without an interval to maximise the tension. However, an interval was inserted in certain productions due to pressure from falling bar takings.

The published script is for the proscenium, but the Stephen Joseph theatre used both this format and the round format in various productions. The version in the round originally had the problem that the door to Julia's room that flies open dramatically at the end was invisible to part of the audience. This problem was addressed in the 2008 revival by making the entrance to the room a trapdoor instead.

== Synopsis ==
Andy wanders into a near-perfect reproduction of Julia's room, says, in astonishment, "My God". He pushes a button, and a recorded voice of an actress as Julia Lukin speak, fondly talking about her room and her music. Then a man's voice solemnly announces that it was this room where she was found dead aged nineteen. Whilst he listens, Joe, Julia's father, joins him, and proudly talks about the exhibition. It is part of the Julia Lukin centre, the pet project of Joe that Andy was invited to see. Andy listens patiently and ignores some tactless remarks about his wife, but hints that he wants to get back to his family soon. Joe, however, insists Andy stays and listens to a couple of other Julia recordings. One of them has whispers of "No" in the background, and the other has an unhappy laugh – something which Joe believes is an attempt by Julia to contact him.

Andy suggests that, after twelve years, it's time to let it go. Undeterred, Joe talks about Julia's childhood and her discovery, giving away that he dominated the lives of his daughter, and, also his wife, Dolly, who died recently. Understanding little about music himself, he is proud of the title the press gave her of "Little Miss Mozart" (something Julia actually hated). Joe questions the verdict of death by misadventure, and dismisses Andy's suggestion that the likely alternative was suicide. Although he doesn't suspect Andy, who was at a party the night she died, he suspects a man Julia referred to as "my secret admirer" (someone whom Andy now thinks she invented).

The doorbell rings and Joe leaves. The guest, Ken Chase, arrives and introduces himself to Andy, as mortuary attendant who had "an enforced career change". When Joe returns (having rung Andy's wife, Kay, to say he'll he late), Ken correctly guesses Andy is a music teacher, before going on to claim he is a psychic. He explains, in a calm and factual manner, that it is a gift that most people could use if they wanted. Andy reacts to this with hostility, especially after discovering Ken is here at Joe's invitation after seeing the exhibition and writing him a letter.

Ken crosses the ropes and, he claims, is struck with a feeling of unhappiness. This coincides with a coldness that Joe and Andy felt in the roped area (and, as it turns out, all the areas where the original house used to be). He opens the original door to the room but finds only a brick wall, for the other side now houses an air-conditioning plant. Asking for something close to Julia, he picks up the teddy bear, and (after setting off an alarm the first time), he reacts vigorously with emotion. Julia, he says, is unhappy, not because of Joe or Andy, who she loves, but because of the music. Then, promoted by hints dropped by Andy, Joe realises the bear is not Julia's but a replacement for the stolen original.

Joe and Andy both now turn on Ken, who confesses he knew Julia (or "Julie" as he always referred to her). Andy realises he was the janitor who used to live in the basement. Ken admits he was Julia's "secret admirer", not, as Joe first assumes, a sexual relationship, but merely that she visited him and his family from time to time (in contrast to never visiting Joe who moved to be near her). She spent her time playing their out-of-tune piano, playing games, and helping with the cooking and sewing (badly), but never discussing her own music. Ken explains that on the afternoon before she died, she seemed a different person, saying, for the first time, she loved her parents, and he now wonders if it was her way of saying goodbye. Choosing to pretend they hardly knew her in the media scrum following her death, it is only now that he is setting the record straight.

Agreeing they should go home, Ken and Andy leave Joe alone for a moment. A discordant piano starts playing, and Joe, shouting for Julia, flings open the door only to see the wall. Andy and Ken return, and whilst Joe searches for intruders, Ken politely confronts Andy, whom he saw leaving the house the day she died, and Andy confesses he knows the real reason she died. For over a year, he had been coming to her house and never had any affection returned, until he met Kay. On that day, he went to her house to tell Julia he was seeing Kay and probably wouldn't see her again, only to find her waiting for him, room tidied, hair brushed and bed made. When he went ahead and told her, she pleaded with him, and Andy, angry that she hadn't cared about his feelings all the time, left, went to a party, and got drunk.

Returning to the music and the door, Andy, who has consistently dismissed supernatural explanations, suggests Joe may have set this all up himself. However, when the lights start dimming, a woman starts crying, and Joe returns denying anything to do with that; Ken suggests Andy is running out of options, and Andy begrudgingly agrees to wait and see. Joe talks about never seeing the body, and how his wife reacted violently when he told her the news. Suggesting it was just as well Joe didn't see the body, Andy tells them what he saw. Simplifying the events of the previous night to "a row", Andy says he went back in the morning thinking he should make things up. The first thing he saw was blood all over the sheets, for Julia had taken not only sleeping pills but everything she could get her hands on. He then saw her body between the bed and the desk, and he believes she tried to get back to her music.

Suddenly, the piano plays again, and stops. Footsteps are heard where the stairs used to be, and there is a knock on the door, with Julia's voice saying "Dad ... dad ... dad ..." The door then flies open, and everything in the room is hurled about. Andy and Ken and thrown to the ground, but Joe, it seems, can see Julia. As he calls out to her, blood starts spreading out on the bed. Ken tells Joe that Julia is now released, and they both leave the room. Andy is the last to leave, saying once more "My God". After leaving, the voice of Julia plays one more time.

== Productions ==
Programme cover for the 1999 revival

Programme cover for the 2008 revival as part of Things That Go Bump

The original production at the Stephen Joseph Theatre had its first performance on 12 April 1994, and an opening night on 20 April 1994, featuring the following cast:

- Joe – Ian Hogg
- Andy- Damien Goodwin
- Ken – Adrian McLoughlin
- Voice of "Julia" – Cathy Sara

The production team were:

- Director – Alan Ayckbourn
- Design – Roger Glossop
- Lighting – Jackie Staines
- Music – John Pattison

Owing to the lack of an available end-stage theatre, the interval-free play was performed, in the round. This led to difficulties as some of the audience could not see the door that flies open at the end of the play. As a result, the play had mixed success. It did not tour, and the script was not published.

In 1999, with the Stephen Joseph Theatre moved to its new venue and a proscenium theatre available, the play was revived in its intended end-stage format, with John Branwell as Joe, Bill Champion as Andy and Richard Derrington as Ken. Under pressure from bar takings, an interval was introduced into the play. This time, the play had more success, and the production toured, although it did not include London. The script was published as part of "Plays 3" in 2005, although the interval was removed from the published version.

In 2008, Haunting Julia was again revived by Stephen Joseph Theatre Company as part of the Things That Go Bump trilogy, along with 2002 play Snake in the Grass (generally regarded as a female companion play) and new play Life and Beth, which combined the cast of these two plays. Ian Hogg and Adrian Adrian McLoughlin reprised their roles from 1994, with Richard Stacey playing the role of Andy. Richard Derrington also re-appeared as Director. With the other two plays written for the Round, it was decided to revert to a performance in the Round, and the problem with the door was overcome by changing it to a trapdoor. The interval was also removed. This play toured to New Vic Theatre as part of the trilogy.

In 2012, Haunting Julia made its North American premiere at The Little Theatre of Norfolk, with Joel Nathan King as Joe, Ryan McIntire as Andy and Philip Odango as Ken.

In 2021, Haunting Julia was revived by Huddersfield-based company, Dick & Lottie, known for their acclaimed productions of Ayckbourn's work, at the Lawrence Batley Theatre in the town. The director was John Cotgrave and the cast was as follows: Phil Butterfield as Joe, Michael Alex Thompson as Andy, and Adam Elms as Ken.

== Critical reviews ==
Although the critics of the original production were unanimous in recognising the play as a new departure for Ayckbourn, the reviews were heavily polarised. Robin Thornber for The Guardian praised the play for building the character of Julia effective in spite of her never being on stage, as did David Jeffels of The Stage. Kate Bassett for The Times drew comparisons with the child Wolfgang Mozart and the death of Kurt Cobain, although she had some doubts about the ending. However, Charles Spencer of the Daily Telegraph held the opinion that the play aimed to be both a ghost story or a study of grief and failed to do either, although he liked the character of Ken and the final ten minutes. Paul Taylor for The Independent was just as scathing, dismissing Joe's shrine to Julia and Ken's 12-year wait to tell Joe what he knew as implausible.

It has been suggested that the difference in opinion may have been down to reviewers being split between those who favoured Ayckbourn's move towards more contemporary themes, and those who preferred his earlier plays concentrating on social realism.

The 1999 and 2008 revivals, however, were generally received positively.
