= Samantha Robinson =

Samantha Robinson may refer to:

- Samantha Robinson (English actress) (born 1981)
- Samantha Robinson (American actress) (born 1991)
