= FlatSpin =

2001 play by Alan Ayckbourn

- Programme cover from original SJT Production
- Written by: Alan Ayckbourn
- Characters: Rosie Seymour; Sam Berryman; Annette Sefton-Wilcox; Edna Stricken; Maurice Whickett; Tracy Taylor; Tommy Angel
- Original language: English
- Series: Damsels in Distress
- Subject: Romance, Secret Service
- Genre: Comedy thriller
- Setting: Joanna Rupelford's flat, London Docklands, 2001

Premiere
- Date premiered: 3 July 2001
- Place premiered: Stephen Joseph Theatre, Scarborough
- Official website

FlatSpin is a 2001 play by British playwright Alan Ayckbourn, the second in a trilogy of plays called Damsels in Distress (GamePlan and Roleplay being parts one and three.) It is about an actress called Rosie Seymour who accepts a date with a mysterious Sam Berryman, who seems to have mistaken her for a Joanna Rupelford.

== Background ==
FlatSpin, along with GamePlan, was originally intended to be part of a pair of plays, both set in the London Docklands, and both using the same cast of seven. Ayckbourn has a flat in the Docklands, where he observed the neighbours do not know each other well and strange things can happen under their noses. The pair of plays was eventually joined by a third, RolePlay, written as an afterthought, and the trilogy, Damsels in Distress, was shown in the Stephen Joseph Theatre's 2001 season. Like the other two plays, this drew some inspiration from the London Docklands.

Originally intended as a diptych, FlatSpin served as the contrast to the much darker GamePlan. As such, it had some of the lightness associated with Ayckbourn's early comedies.

== Characters ==
As part of the Damsels in Distress trilogy, FlatSpin was written to use the same seven actors as the other two plays in the series. In this play, the characters are:

- Rosie Seymour, mid-twenties, out-of-work actress, currently a flat-minder
- Sam Berryman, thirties, something secret
- Annette Sefton-Wilcox, late thirties, property company representative
- Edna Stricken, forties, drug courier
- Maurice Whickett, fifties, Sam's boss
- Tracy Taylor, twenties, Maurice's favourite "helper"
- Tommy Angel, thirties, thickset ex-SAS bodyguard

Rosie and Sam are the central characters; the other characters make appearances in one or two scenes.

== Setting ==
The entire play is set in flat belonging to a Joanna Rupelford, on the riverside in the London Docklands. As part of Damsels in Distress, the play was written to use the identical set to the other two plays. As with most Ayckbourn plays, it was originally performed in the Round for its original performances at the Stephen Joseph Theatre. However, it was adapted for the Proscenium for subsequent performances elsewhere.

The play is performed in two Acts, each divided into two scenes.

== Synopsis ==
At the beginning of the play, Annette Sefton-Wilcox introduces Rosie Seymour to one of several flats she is minding for a few days. This flat belongs to a Joanna Rupelford, who never seems to be at home (to the point where the labels are still on the pans). In the conversation, it is disclosed that Rosie is an actress with little success behind her (her only role so far being a rabbit in a miserable touring children's production), and no boyfriend, and that she is openly desperate for both. Her one hope is that she is down to the last two for a big role as Jane Eyre, but just after Annette leaves, Rosie receives a call from her agent tell her the part went to the other girl.

Before Rosie can despair too long, Sam Berryman calls, introducing himself as a neighbour. After a few misunderstandings (including mistaking Rosie for a lesbian when Rosie says "it was between me and another girl"), Sam leaves, and comes back in again to start afresh. After further confusions, he goes out and comes back in again, and this time introduces himself, tells Rosie that she is the most beautiful woman he has ever seen, and asks to take her out for dinner. Rosie, having already warmed to his magic tricks and stories of visiting sick children in hospital, accepts immediately. The only problem is that Sam assumes that Rosie is Joanna Rupelford.

In the second scene, Rosie waits for Sam to come and cook dinner in her flat. Rosie tries on Joanna Rupelford's dresses. And the spanner in the works is that a woman keeps trying to contact Joanna, first by phone, and then in person. Rosie hurries her away, and the date itself works extremely well – so well, in fact, that Sam's hands-on demonstration with Rosie of how to roll gnocchi ends up with them kissing on the work surface. Realising the cookery will never be completed, Rosie goes to the bedroom. But before Sam joins her, he makes a telephone call. Whoever he calls clearly insists Sam leave the flat, and leave now. Rosie is left on her own, thinking she has been left in the lurch yet again (albeit before sex and not after, which usually seems to be the case for her).

Act Two follows immediately from the end of Act One. Rosie is suddenly confronted by two black-clad figures, Maurice Whickett and Tracy Taylor, the latter of whom is furious with her. When Sam returns, it is clear he knows these two strangers. It soon transpires that the three of them were all part of a sting: Joanna Rupelford does not actually exist, the flat has been set up for six months, there are cameras all over the flat (including the bedroom, which is some consolation to Rosie for earlier), and the operation to entrap a drugs courier is due to take place that night. Maurice is angry with Sam, who evidently does this sort of thing all the time, for disrupting the plan.

The problem now is that Tracy was going to impersonate Joanna, but Edna Stricken – the woman who Rosie hurried away earlier – now believes that Rosie is Joanna, spoiling Tracy's big chance (an analogy to Rosie losing her big chance as Jane Eyre). The only chance of success now is if Rosie continues impersonating Joanna. Sam persuades Rosie, against her better judgement, to do so.

In the final scene, Rosie is waiting in the flat ready. She has been reassured that she will be watched on camera, and help will come if there's any trouble. She is in the company of Tommy Angel, an ex-SAS bodyguard who makes wildly optimistic passes at Rosie, such as suggesting that many people find this sort of danger arousing. Tommy then asks Rosie to hit him on the head to show how tough he is. Rosie does so, and Tommy instantly falls unconscious, out of view. Seconds later, Edna calls at the door. Rosie plays the part of Joanna well, and hands over the case of money from a hidden compartment in a table as soon as she sees the drugs. Unfortunately, when Edna inspects the briefcase, it is full of cut newspaper instead of money. Even though Rosie knows nothing about it, Edna tries to punish Rosie by spraying acid in her eyes. After a struggle, Edna catches her and is about to do the deed when Tracy comes in and brutally incapacitates her.

With the reason for the late arrival of help explained (the surveillance team got bored and watched the football instead), and Edna removed, Maurice has mixed reactions about the outcome – he got the suspect and the drugs, but he does not relish the prospect of explaining the missing money. He, Tracy and Tommy leave, and then Sam retrieves the real briefcase full of money from the extra secret compartment in the table that Maurice didn't know about. He promises Rosie a tomorrow richer in every way, and they disappear into the shower. Then Maurice and Tracy return and take the money, with Tracy giving Maurice a kiss. They depart, with Maurice quietly wishing Rosie the luck she'll need.

== Productions ==
The play was first performed at the Stephen Joseph Theatre, with an opening night on 28 June 2001, and a premiere on 23 July 2001. It featured the following cast:

- Edna Stricken – Jacqueline King
- Tracy Taylor – Saskia Butler
- Rosie Seymour – Alison Pargeter
- Maurice Whickett – Robert Austin
- Tommy Angel – Tim Faraday
- Annette Sefton-Wilcox – Beth Tuckey
- Sam Berryman – Bill Champion

The production team was the following:

- Director – Alan Ayckbourn
- Design – Roger Glossop
- Lighting – Mick Hughes
- Costumes – Christine Wall
- Music – Keith Jarrett

The production then toured. The first West End performance was made at the Duchess Theatre, opening on 7 September 2001, and featured the same cast and production team. However, the success of RolePlay over the other two productions led to FlatSpin being sidelined, along with GamePlan, until eventually it was shown only once a week, to the disappointment of both Ayckbourn and the cast.

There are two further professional productions recorded at the Arts Archive since the original Stephen Joseph Theatre run, slightly behind GamePlan and RolePlay.

== Critical reviews ==
Shortly before FlatSpin was premiered, it was announced that a third Damsels in Distress play would be performed later in the season. As a result, there were few stand-alone reviews of FlatSpin, with many reviewers choosing to wait for RolePlay to review the plays together. This did not stop Jeremy Kingston of The Times giving a broadly positive review of the play, in spite of some reservations about some logical flaws, in particular singling out commendation for Alison Pargeter for her performance as Rosie. Charles Hutchinson of the Yorkshire Evening Press also gave praise for her performance, noting that until now her career had consisted mostly of child and teenage roles (GamePlan included), and writing "... it is like that moment when the librarian takes off her glasses".

When the production was reviewed as part of the whole trilogy, both in Scarborough and on the tour, it generally enjoyed a good reception as part of the package. By now, the play had been compared at least twice to the film North by Northwest. However, the play was again criticised for the holes in its logic, leading some reviewers to consider the play the weakest of the three.

Alison Pargeter's role as Rosie Seymour contributed to her winning the Best Newcomer in the Critics' Circle Awards.
