= RolePlay (play) =

2001 play by Alan Ayckbourn

- Written by: Alan Ayckbourn
- Characters: Justin Lazenby; Julie-Ann Jobson; Paige Petite; Micky Rale; Derek Jobson; Dee Jobson; Arabella Lazenby
- Original language: English
- Series: Damsels in Distress
- Subject: Romance, class difference
- Genre: Comedy
- Setting: Justin Lazenby's flat, London Docklands, 2001

Premiere
- Date premiered: 4 September 2001
- Place premiered: Stephen Joseph Theatre, Scarborough
- Official website

RolePlay is a 2001 play by British playwright Alan Ayckbourn, the third in a trilogy of plays called Damsels in Distress (GamePlan and FlatSpin being parts one and two). It is about an engaged couple, Julie-Ann Jobson and Justin Lazenby whose engagement party is interrupted by unexpected intrusions.

== Background ==
Damsels in Distress was originally intended to be only a pair of plays: GamePlan and FlatSpin. However, during early preparations, Ayckbourn had an idea for a third play, RolePlay. When the cast agreed to the third play, the end of the Stephen Joseph Theatre's 2001 season was altered to accommodate this third play. Like the other two plays, this drew some inspiration from the London Docklands, where Alan Ayckbourn has a flat, and people often do not know each other well.

== Characters ==
As part of the Damsels in Distress trilogy, RolePlay was written to use the same seven actors as the other two plays in the series. In this play, the characters are:

- Justin Lazenby, about thirty, a software developer
- Julie-Ann Jobson, twenty-three, Justin's somewhat mismatched fiancée
- Paige Petite, twenty-nine, an ex-dancer living in a penthouse upstairs
- Micky Rale, forty, an ex-boxer and Paige's "minder"
- Derek Jobson, late fifties, Julie-Ann's right-wing father
- Dee Jobson, forty-five, Julie-Ann's mother
- Arabella Lazenby, fifties, Justin's stylishly alcoholic mother

== Setting ==
The entire play is set in Justin Lazenby's flat, on the riverside in the London Docklands. As part of Damsels in Distress, the play was written to use the identical set to the other two plays. As with most Ayckbourn plays, it was originally performed in the Round for its original production at the Stephen Joseph Theatre. However, it was adapted for the Proscenium for subsequent performances elsewhere.

The play is performed in two Acts. The first Act is divided into two scenes, and the second Act is one continuous scene.

== Synopsis ==
=== Act 1 ===
==== Scene 1 ====
The play opens where Justin Lazenby and Julie-Ann Jobson are busy preparing for a dinner party. Julie-Ann's parents are expected, as is Justin's mother with her current "man-friend". It is intended Justin will announce their engagement but, there are already warning signs that they are perhaps not fully compatible. Julie-Ann's desperation to get every detail perfect isn't a good sign, neither is Justin's reaction to her suggestion of living chastely apart until their wedding night. In the meantime, Justin receives a series of phone calls from his mother, Arabella, indicating that she will be both drunk and late.

However, after Julie-Ann leaves in search of a replacement for a missing fork, a bigger problem emerges: a woman falls into Justin's balcony. She is Paige Petite, who climbed out of the window of the penthouse she lives in, on the run from her violent gangster boyfriend, Rudi, who mistakenly believes she cheated on him. Before she can leave, Paige's "minder", Micky Rale, enters, having gone in search of her. Paige refuses to go back with him, and Micky refuses to leave without her. Julie-Ann returns to discover Paige (having earlier taken a bath) wearing the dress she was intending to wear. Julie-Ann demands Paige takes off the dress, but it ends with Micky pointing a gun at Justin and insisting Julie-Ann helps herself to one of Paige's dresses upstairs. After Julie-Ann leaves, Micky acknowledges Justin is holding a party this evening and asks "Is there anything we can do to help?"

==== Scene 2 ====
In the second scene, Justin, Micky and Paige are still waiting for Julie-Ann's return. Julie-Ann's parents from Doncaster, Derek and Dee Jobson, arrive first. They instantly warm to Justin, but whilst it is clear they regard Julie-Ann (nicknamed "our apple") with far more fondness than their other two daughters. When Julie-Ann finally returns, it is in one of Paige's revealing dresses, much to her parents' horror.

When Justin's mother, Arabella, finally arrives, it is without her "man-friend" Olaf, who was ditched en route. Very drunk, she mistakes Paige for Justin's fiancée and says Justin has finally struck gold. When Justin eventually manages to point out which girl Julie-Ann really is, she says "He's done it again! Another bloody dog." Julie-Ann leaves in tears, Arabella collapses on the sofa, and the Act closes with Justin cheerfully saying "Soup anyone?"

=== Act 2 ===
The second act takes place after the dinner. In spite of Arabella spending the entire dinner unconscious, and Paige and Micky joining the meal and messing up the cutlery arrangement, things have evidently gone well. Julie-Ann, having swapped dresses with Paige at some point, attempts to make things up with Arabella, although Arabella never seems to grasp which girl is which. However, things start to go downhill when Derek has a private word with Justin. Derek suggests Justin should move up to Doncaster to take over his garden centre business, oblivious to Justin's hints that he is not interested. Furthermore, Justin learns from Derek that the reason Derek and Dee fell out with Julie-Ann's two sisters was because one of them is a lesbian and the other married a Chinese man.

Meanwhile, Micky takes the occasional phone call from an angry Rudi, now returning from a boxing match in Birmingham (where all his fighters lost). Paige gets increasingly fearful of what he will do to her when he returns, but Micky refuses to change his mind – not because he wishes this on her, but because he is doing his job. In spite of this, Paige rescues Micky when Arabella takes an interest in his boxing career, claiming he was brilliantly successful when in fact he was a dismal failure. After Arabella falls and breaks fourteen glasses, the evening starts to fall flat. Derek makes a few lame jokes that his family find hilarious, then attempts to start a couple of racist jokes. Undeterred, Julie-Ann insists on Justin's speech. Justin attempts to start with "It's with great pleasure ..." but keeps stalling on "It's ...", and instead breaks into It's a Long Way to Tipperary.

The conversation then moves to Paige's common-sounding voice, and she says it was down to a motorbike accident she had when she was younger – a story that Justin correctly suspects she made up. Arabella then suggests Paige does a dance as her party piece, (having earlier misunderstood what kind of "dancer" she is). Paige, having been incensed by the Jobsons over the evening, agrees and gives Justin a lap dance, before Julie-Ann attacks her. Considering the evening a write-off, Justin gets his mother away into a taxi before Julie-Ann talks to him. She forgives him, but in a way that implies that she expects Justin to take up Derek's garden centre offer to stay together.

The doorbell rings, which Justin believes to be Rudi. He is all set to deny everything, but it is only Arabella, having only made it a few hundred yards instead of to Godalming. Micky, having warmed to Arabella, and moved by Paige's story of her accident, not to mention fear of his getting hurt too when Rudi returns, offers to take Arabella home in Rudi's favourite car, thereby setting Paige free. Justin gives Paige some money to get on her way, but by now he wants an escape from his own life. He persuades Paige to take him with her. They leave together, and the play ends just as Rudi's gangsters are trying to force their way through the door to a surprised Derek and Dee.

== Productions ==
The production at the Stephen Joseph Theatre had an opening night on 30 August 2001 and a premiere on 4 September 2001 (the late performance in the season due to the play being a late idea). It featured the following cast:

- Arabella Lazenby – Jacqueline King
- Julie-Ann Jobson – Saskia Butler
- Paige Petite – Alison Pargeter
- Derek Jobson – Robert Austin
- Micky Rale – Tim Faraday
- Dee Jobson – Beth Tuckey
- Justin Lazenby – Bill Champion

The production team was the following:

- Director – Alan Ayckbourn
- Design – Roger Glossop
- Lighting – Mick Hughes
- Costumes – Christine Wall
- Music – Keith Jarrett

The production then toured, including a return to the Stephen Joseph Theatre in November to make up for the short run earlier.

The first West End performance was made at the Duchess Theatre on 7 September 2002, featuring the same cast and production team. The success of this play over the other two Damsels in Distress plays eventually led to this play dominating the run. This caused considerable upset amongst Ayckbourn and the cast who had expected the plays to be performed equally. Eventually, Ayckbourn expressed his frustration with West End Theatre in general. This was interpreted by many as a threat to boycott the West End altogether.

In 2004 and 2005, the play received three further professional productions by professional theatre companies.

== Critical Reviews ==
In spite of RolePlay being the afterthought of the trilogy, it earned the most praise of the three plays, throughout the original Scarborough run, the tour, and the later West End production. Whilst the critics were unanimous in praise of the play, opinions varied as to how they saw the play. Some saw it a revival of 'Classic Ayckbourn', and Paul Taylor of The Independent wrote that it "returns to vintage Ayckbourn territory: the dinner party from hell." Others, however, saw the play as having more depth Michael Billington of The Guardian wrote about the trilogy as a whole: "It shows Ayckbourn moving beyond his familiar terrain of suburban angst to deal with metropolitan madness and moral confusion.". Jeremy Kingston commended the play for the collision of three different worlds, and scenes where six of the characters remain immobile whilst the seventh speaks.

There were a number of niggling criticisms, including questioning why Julie-Ann did not call the police whilst she had the chance, but none of them bore any weight on the overall verdict of the plays.

Alison Pargeter won Best Newcomer in the Critics' Circle Awards for her role as Paige, along with her roles as Kelly in GamePlan and Rosie in FlatSpin.
