= Ruth Gibson =

British actress

- Born: Avening, Gloucestershire
- Education: Sir William Romney secondary, Tetbury Gloucestershire UK
- Occupation: British Actress
- Years active: 2006-present

Ruth Gibson is a British actress, most notable for playing Jane in Bridget Jones: Mad About the Boy, voicing Little My in the English version of the Moomins on the Riviera animated film, Sabrina Glevissig in The Witcher series and Polly Grey in Peaky Blinders: The King's Ransom. She has also appeared in Babylon (TV series), Doctors (2000 TV series) and Call The Midwife as well as numerous stage plays including Blood Brothers (musical) in West End theatre and The Kitchen at the Royal National Theatre. She has worked extensively with Alan Ayckbourn including being original cast in Life and Beth and My Wonderful Day which was nominated for a Drama Desk Award after an off Broadway run in New York. In 2010 she won 'Best Actress in a Leading Role' in the Manchester Evening News Theatre Awards.

She is the Voice of EE Limited and BT Group.
