= Woman in Mind =

32nd play by Alan Ayckbourn

- Original language: English
- Written by: Alan Ayckbourn
- Characters: Susan; Gerald; Muriel; Rick; Bill; Andy; Tony; Lucy
- Subject: Madness, family neglect
- Genre: Tragi-comedy
- Setting: A real garden, and an imaginary estate

Premiere
- Date: 30 May 1985
- Place: Stephen Joseph Theatre (Westwood site), Scarborough
- Official website

Woman in Mind (December Bee) is the 32nd play by English playwright Alan Ayckbourn. It was premiered at the Stephen Joseph Theatre In The Round, Scarborough, in 1985. Despite pedestrian reviews by many critics, strong audience reaction resulted in a transfer to London's West End. The play received its London opening at the Vaudeville Theatre in 1986 where it received predominantly excellent reviews.

Woman in Mind was Ayckbourn's first play to use first-person narrative and a subjective viewpoint and is considered to be one of his most affecting works and one of his best.

== History and influences ==
Woman in Mind was the last play written by Ayckbourn before his two-year sabbatical at the Royal National Theatre. Most of it was written while Ayckbourn was on holiday in the Virgin Islands. Influences for the play include the film Dead on Arrival in which the narrator is revealed to be dead at the climax. The Man Who Mistook His Wife for a Hat by Oliver Sacks is also said to be an influence. There are similarities to Ayckbourn's own play, Just Between Ourselves (1976), which follows a woman, Vera, breaking down due to neglect. But unlike Just Between Ourselves, where the audience sees the breakdown from the point of view of those surrounding Vera, in this play, everything is shown from the point of the view of the increasingly deluded Susan.

Another theme is Susan's relationship to her son who has joined a cult that forbids communication with parents, in what play critic Michael Billington considered to be an attack on organised religion. In his words, the play is "not only about an emotionally neglected middle-aged woman's descent into madness but also the failure of orthodox Christian morality to cope with individual unhappiness."

Unlike most of Ayckbourn's earlier plays, which were often completed the day before rehearsals began, Woman in Mind was completed a week earlier than he expected. Ayckbourn himself was conscious that this play was radically different from his earlier plays in that the audience is expected to engage with a character whose perceptions are unreliable. His agent was sceptical as to whether an audience would accept such an unconventional play, and as the publicity went out before Ayckbourn had begun writing, an unusual brochure note was issued:

At the time of going to press a high wall of secrecy surrounds this project. Some have the theory that the reason for this is to protect such highly original comic material from the risk of plagiarism. Others, more cynical, suggest that it could be due to the fact that the author hasn't started on it yet and is anxious not to commit himself.

Originally intending to have a male central character, Ayckbourn found that a woman's voice was emerging, and felt that the public would be more sympathetic to a woman, and therefore he changed the sex. Ayckbourn has also commented that he did not want the central character to be a man in case audiences took the play to be autobiographical. Nevertheless, Paul Allen, Ayckbourn's biographer, believes that Woman in Mind is Ayckbourn's most personal play and that a major influence on it may have been a breakdown suffered by his mother in the 1950s. He also suggested that Susan's relationship to her son may have been influenced by Alan Ayckbourn's relationship with his son Steven, at the time in a community in California (albeit not a non-speaking cult). This view is not shared by everyone, but it is generally agreed that Woman in Mind is a very personal play to Ayckbourn.

== Characters ==
The central character in Woman in Mind is, of course, Susan. She is a housewife who, in reality, is neglected by her husband, patronised by her sister-in-law, and estranged from her son. In her own imaginary world, by contrast, she is happy, successful, and loved by her perfect family. Susan remains on-stage throughout the play, and everything seen and heard on stage is what is seen and heard by Susan, both real and imagined.

There are four other real characters in the play:

- Gerald, Susan's real husband, a vicar whose interest in his wife has long since faded in favour of his book and undivided attention to his sister;
- Muriel, live-in sister to Gerald, dead weight about the house, self-centred, and an unimaginably bad cook;
- Rick, Susan's real son, who joined a cult that forbids members to speak to their parents; and
- Bill Windsor, Susan's doctor who has a greater fondness for Susan than one would expect.

Contrasting Susan's own family are three imaginary characters, existing only in Susan's mind (and therefore visible to the audience):

- Andy, Susan's imaginary husband, handsome, devoted, master cook, and everything missing from Gerald;
- Tony, Susan's imaginary young brother, again devoted, mischievous, and presumably compensation for Gerald's devotion to Muriel; and
- Lucy, Susan's imaginary daughter, beautiful, close, and, unlike Rick, shares every secret with her.

At first, the imaginary characters are distinguished from the real characters by their white summery outfits. However, as Susan's mind goes out of control, the real characters start entering Susan's imaginary world, until it is very difficult to tell what is real and what is pretend.

== Setting ==
The entire play takes place in what is, in reality, Susan and Gerald's tiny back garden. In Susan's imagination – and with it the audience's view – the same piece of grass becomes a small part of her imaginary vast estate (with trees, lakes and a tennis court all in easy reach), with a transition between the two worlds largely achieved through changes in sound and lighting.

The play set over two acts. The first act can be considered as two scenes, the first scene one afternoon, and the second scene on lunchtime the following day. The second act commences almost immediately where the first act leaves off, and ends some time overnight, but as Susan's perception of reality deteriorates, the passage of time becomes subjective.

The play was originally staged in the round for its original production at the Stephen Joseph Theatre, and adapted for the proscenium for the West End production at the Vaudeville Theatre. It was generally viewed that the play worked better as an end-stage production. However, Alan Ayckbourn later revealed that he felt it was harder to achieve the effect of switching between the two worlds. The problem, he argued, was that whilst the round only makes a scenic statement when one calls upon it to do so, the proscenium makes a scenic statement whether or not it is needed.

== Synopsis ==
=== Act 1 ===
==== Scene 1 ====
Susan awakes to a man tending to her speaking apparent gibberish, actually misheard English (such as "Squeezy cow, squeezy" really meaning "Easy now, easy"). He is Dr. Windsor (or "octer bin sir"), and Susan suggests she's died and gone where no-one speaks English, and when Bill says "December bee" ("Remember me"), Susan retorts that there are no bees in December. When Bill's language starts to make sense, he explains she knocked herself out with a garden rake.

After Bill leaves to fetch a cup of tea, Susan's husband (Andy), lovingly tends to her, joined by daughter Lucy and brother Tony, fresh from the tennis courts. All show concern for her welfare and tease her about the rake. Lucy and Tony fetch the ice, and Andy goes to cancel the ambulance Bill has ordered.

When Bill returns, however, it is apparent something is not right. Bill sees a tiny garden, whilst Susan insists her garden is massive, complete with rose-beds, swimming pool, tennis courts and lake. Susan also denies having a sister-in-law or son and becomes more confused when Bill says that her husband has not yet come home. When her real husband (Gerald) and sister-in-law (Muriel) enter, Susan faints.

==== Scene 2 ====
The following day, Susan, dozing in the garden, is woken by Gerald. Now back in tune with the real world, she openly discusses the deadness of their marriage, something Gerald insensitively glosses over. Muriel serves "coffee": ground coffee prepared as one would do instant. Indignantly Muriel points out she tended to her late mother, then late husband (or finished off, as Susan sees it) before digressing into her deluded conviction that her late husband's ghost will return with a message.

When Gerald reminds Susan that their son, Rick, is coming for lunch, it transpires that he joined a sect two years ago that forbids members from talking to their parents. He writes, but only to Gerald. Susan, hurt by this, blames this (and Rick's fear of women) on the public school scholarship Gerald bullied him to take. Susan is momentarily distracted by glimpses of Tony and Lucy, before Bill returns to check on Susan, only to be drawn into Gerald's account of the book he's writing on the history of the Parish. Susan therefore takes the opportunity to talk to Lucy, who praises her for her status as a historical novelist, and then informs her (naturally Susan is the first to know) that she is getting married.

In the real world, Bill agrees to stay for lunch (Muriel's "omelette surprise", where she mistakes the tea tin for herbs). Gerald makes excuses for the sect, until confessing that Rick is coming to sell the possessions in his room – something that horrifies Susan as this is all she has left of him. Bill offers to act as a go-between so that Gerald and Susan can communicate with their son.

When Rick arrives, even Gerald has trouble bringing himself into the house. But before Susan can enter, her imaginary family brings her a sumptuous outdoor banquet and persuades her to dine with them instead. Rick then comes into the garden and, to Susan's surprise, asks her to come inside. As she goes to her son, she collapses again.

=== Act 2 ===
Susan wakes to find Rick still speaking to her, explaining that he has left the sect he and now has a girlfriend. Her joy, however, is short-lived when she learns they are already married and they are moving to Thailand – her to do nursing, and him to do "odd jobs". He will not even allow Susan to see her, because Rick is embarrassed by the way she acted around past girlfriends.

Rick leaves a stung Susan to explain this to Gerald, who says "it's not fair to lay all the blame at your door". They get into a fierce argument, with Susan egged on by Tony and Lucy (by now sitting in on most of Susan's conversations). Lucy tries to console Susan by praising her status as a brilliant heart surgeon. This time, Susan snaps at Lucy to shut up. Lucy runs off in tears, and Susan tries to apologise only for it to be accepted by Gerald.

In the sunset of her imaginary world, Andy caresses Susan and forgives her for being angry with Lucy. Susan, now worried by the increasing influence that Lucy, Tony and Andy have on her real life, tries to ask Andy to leave her alone. Andy says they will go when she asks but stays when Susan does so, suggesting she didn't really mean it. The scene becomes unreal, with Andy anticipating everything Susan says, then the voices of Susan and her imaginary family coming out of both their mouths.

Back in reality, Susan finds Bill beside her (who fled on mention of a dessert but has now returned). Susan confides to Bill about her hallucinations, and when asked about Rick, tells him a semi-fantasy where he is getting married, and she has met her daughter-in-law to be. Having previously hinted over his own family life – two daughters married to wheeler-dealer stockbrokers and a wife probably cheating with another doctor – Bill reveals how he feels about her, and is about to kiss her when Susan points to Lucy. Bill tries to humour Susan by talking where Susan pointed, but Lucy has already moved away. Tony and Andy arrive, and suddenly, Bill becomes part of her fantasy – now a wheeler-dealer stockbroker poaching rabbits. His is thrown into the lake, leaving Andy and Susan to reminisce on their own wedding day. As he kisses her, Susan weakly protests "Oh dear God! I'm making love to the devil!”

At an indeterminate time overnight, Gerald and Rick find Susan sprawled out in the middle of the lawn during a thunderstorm. Gerald tries to bring Susan inside, but she mocks him with an offer of a quiet divorce. It appears that Susan has burnt Gerald's precious book of the Parish, something Susan has no memory of. Then Muriel comes out screaming, having read a message of "Knickers off Muriel". She refuses all pleas to come inside, denouncing Gerald for narrow-minded meanness, Rick as a priggish brat, and Muriel for wanting a phantom pregnancy.

Tony appears and opens an umbrella and the storm ends in time for what initially appears to be Lucy's wedding, but Tony and Andy appear to be some sort of race stewards, and Lucy, although dressed as a bride, seems to be taking part in a "brides race". Meanwhile, Bill becomes a clichéd bookie, Muriel is a heavily pregnant French maid, Gerald is an archbishop and Susan's real son Rick (now an odd-job man), to her horror, seems to be the groom for her imaginary daughter Lucy. All kinds of snippets relating to her real-life mesh together as a surrealistic nightmare. Ignoring Susan's protests, they all toast her, acclaiming Susan as precious to them all, demanding a speech.

The final shred of reality is when Muriel says "The ambulance is on its way", and a blue light flashes. Susan's speech descends into the same gibberish Bill used at the beginning of the play, and, with a desperate request to "December bee", she collapses a final time.

== Productions ==
=== Premiere ===
Woman in Mind received its world premiere at the Stephen Joseph Theatre in the Round, Scarborough, on 30 May 1985. The production was directed by Ayckbourn and the cast consisted of:

- Ursula Jones as Susan
- Barry McCarthy as Bill
- Robin Herford as Andy
- Caroline Webster as Lucy
- John Hudson as Tony
- Russell Dixon as Gerald
- Heather Stoney as Muriel
- Tom Bowles as Rick

The production team consisted of:

- Director: Alan Ayckbourn
- Design: Adrian P Smith
- Lighting: Francis Lynch
- Musical Director: Paul Todd

=== London premiere ===
Programme cover for the 1986 West End production

In 1986, Woman in Mind transferred to London's West End at the Vaudeville Theatre and received its premiere on 3 September 1986, closing on 4 July 1987. Again directed by Ayckbourn and with design by Roger Glossop, the cast originally consisted of:

- Julia McKenzie as Susan
- Peter Blythe as Bill
- Benedick Blythe as Andy
- Christina Barryk as Lucy
- John Hudson as Tony
- Martin Jarvis as Gerald
- Josephine Tewson as Muriel
- Daniel Flynn as Rick

The initial production team consisted of:

- Director: Alan Ayckbourn
- Design: Roger Glossop
- Lighting: David Hersey
- Musical Director: Paul Todd

The production was later recast, with Alan Strachan taking over the directing from Alan Ayckbourn.

=== American premiere ===
Woman in Mind received its American premiere in New York on 17 February 1988 at the Manhattan Theatre Club. The production was directed by Lynne Meadow and the cast included Stockard Channing in the role of Susan.

Helen Mirren appeared as Susan in a 1992 production at the Tiffany Theatre in Los Angeles.

=== 2008–2009 revival ===
In 2008, the play was revived at the Stephen Joseph Theatre, again directed by Alan Ayckbourn. It had been intended for several years to revive this play with the lead role performed by Janie Dee, with whom Alan Ayckbourn had worked on various occasions since 1992. The production was originally scheduled for the autumn 2006 season. However, on 21 February 2006, Alan Ayckbourn suffered a stroke and the production of Woman in Mind was eventually dropped. The play was eventually rescheduled for the autumn 2008 season, as part of Ayckbourn's final season as artistic director.

After a successful month-long run, it was announced that the play would transfer to the West End, again at the Vaudeville Theatre. It was the first play to be directed by Alan Ayckbourn in the West End since Damsels in Distress (whose treatment by the West End had led to Alan Ayckbourn's threat of a "boycott"). Janie Dee reprised her role, as did most of the Scarborough cast, and the play was produced by Bill Kenwright who had revived Absurd Person Singular in 2007. It had a premiere on 6 February 2009, with a full run from 29 January to 2 May.

== Critical review ==
Although the original Scarborough production ran to full capacity, the reviews in the national papers were very mixed. Martin Hoyle for the Financial Times praised the play for Ayckbourn venturing into new darker territory (citing touches of The Secret Life of Walter Mitty, Blithe Spirit and The Exorcist) whilst remaining a uniquely Ayckbourn play. Robin Thornber for The Guardian, meanwhile, was particularly positive about the way Ayckbourn combined the character's ideal fantasy world with her bleak real word. At the other end of the scale, however, Martin Cropper, writing in The Times derided the play for all characters, real or pretend, being Ayckbourn stock characters.

However, the West End production had a much better reception, with critics agreeing the play had matured and – in spite of Ayckbourn's views to the contrary – that the play worked better in the Proscenium than the Round. Julia McKenzie was especially singled out for praise and won the Evening Standard award for best actress for her portrayal as Susan. Roger Glossop's set design also received praise for its J. M. Barrie-esque sinister and seductive ambiance. In addition, Julia Mackenzie also received many anecdotal stories of how members of the audience had been affected by the play, including a woman who couldn't leave at the end whilst her son said "Mum, Mum," a father and daughter who spoke afterwards about things they had kept silent for years, and an actor who came to her dressing room and cried. Alan Ayckbourn's own anecdote was of two women competitively boasting of how the play represented their lives.

The American première was also successful, with Stockard Channing winning a Drama Desk Award for best actress.

The 2008–2009 revival was also generally received positively. In spite of this, the play closed one month earlier than originally intended and replaced with Duet for One by Tom Kempinski.

== Related Play ==
- Invisible Friends (1989) a play "supposedly for children" also by Alan Ayckbourn, which is considered by the author to be influenced by Woman in Mind in themes, whilst also being much lighter. Ayckbourn reuses the name Lucy (Susan's imaginary daughter in Woman in Mind) for Invisible Friends, as Lucy Baines "an ordinary teenager" and protagonist of the play, whose imagination runs away with her.
