= Island at War =

2004 British TV drama series

- Written by: Stephen Mallatratt
- Starring: James Wilby; Clare Holman; Owen Teale; Julia Ford; Philip Glenister; Saskia Reeves
- Country of origin: United Kingdom
- Original language: English
- No. of series: 1
- No. of episodes: 6

Production
- Executive producers: Sita Williams; Andy Harries
- Running time: approx. 398 min
- Production company: Granada Television

Original release
- Network: ITV
- Release: 11 July – 15 August 2004

Island at War is a British television series that tells the story of the German occupation of the Channel Islands. It primarily focuses on three local families: the upper class Dorrs, the middle class Mahys, and the working class Jonases, and four German officers. The fictional island of St Gregory serves as a stand-in for the real-life islands of Guernsey and Jersey, and the story is compiled from the events on both islands.

Produced by Granada Television in Manchester, Island at War had an estimated budget of £9 million and was filmed on location in the Isle of Man from August 2003 to October 2003. When the series was shown in the UK the following year, it appeared in six 70-minute episodes.

== Cast ==
- James Wilby as James Dorr
- Clare Holman as Felicity Dorr
- Sam Heughan as Phillip Dorr (aka Mr Brotherson)
- Owen Teale as Wilf Jonas
- Julia Ford as Kathleen Jonas
- Sean Gallagher as Sheldon Leveque
- Saskia Reeves as Cassie Mahy
- Julian Wadham as Urban Mahy
- Joanne Froggatt as Angelique Mahy
- Samantha Robinson as June Mahy
- Louisa Clein as Zelda Kay
- Philip Glenister as Baron Von Rheingarten
- Daniel Flynn as Captain Muller
- Colin Tierney as Oberwachtmeister Wimmel
- Conor Mullen as Oberleutnant Walker
- Andrew Havill as Oberleutnant Flach
- Laurence Fox as Bernhardt Tellemann
- Richard Dempsey as Eugene La Salle
- Ann Rye as Ada Jonas
- Sean Ward as Colin Jonas

== Episodes ==
No. overall	No. in series	Title	Original release date
1	1	"Eve of War"	11 July 2004
The invasion by the Germans of the Channel Island St Gregory appears imminent and evacuations are begun.
2	2	"Living with the Enemy"	18 July 2004
The occupation by the Germans begins, resulting in clashes with the local population.
3	3	"To Catch a Spy"	25 July 2004
The hunt for the second spy on the Island continues.
4	4	"Strange Mercies"	1 August 2004
As French prostitutes arrive for the Germans, the romance between Bernhardt and Angelique grows. Zelda goes into hiding with Cassie.
5	5	"Unexpected Mercies"	8 August 2004
The threatened arrest of Eugene's parents by the Baron leads to increased defiance of the islanders. Bernhardt goes on a bombing mission. Cassie begins an affair.
6	6	"Unusual Successes"	15 August 2004
June discovers that Angelique is in love with Bernhardt. Walker locates the man who has injured June and beats him to death. James gives Philip information he has on the Germans on the island. Sheldon agrees to take Zelda and Philip to England, but plans go awry.

== Reception ==
Overall, the miniseries earned more favourable reviews in the United States than in the United Kingdom. In a review by Anita Gates for The New York Times, Gates wrote, "You can call Island at War a soap opera, as some British television critics have, but if that's true this soap opera is a gripping, poetic one—about moral courage in many guises. You might also call it a drama of manners." New York magazine called the series "reasonably absorbing but no great classic." In the Channel Islands themselves the series faced widespread criticism in the local press owing to inaccuracy, mispronunciation of names (for example, 'Mahy' was pronounced 'Mah-hee' rather than 'Ma'yee') and the fact that the series was filmed not on the islands themselves but on the Isle of Man. The Guernsey Press noted that "the programme caused outrage among many people who accused the producers of distorting Guernsey history."

== DVD release ==
The complete DVD collection was released in 2008, by Acorn Media UK. The DVD received a second release in 2017 by Network.

== Cancelled second series ==
Although highly successful during its initial transmission the series ended rather abruptly. The writer Stephen Mallatratt died from cancer shortly after the series was broadcast. This, coupled with the high production cost and controversy over historical accuracy, meant the series came to an end. Each episode cost around £1 million to produce.
