= Theatre Royal, Norwich =

Art Deco theatre in Norwich, England

Coordinates: 52.627183°N 1.290520°E

Norwich Theatre Royal
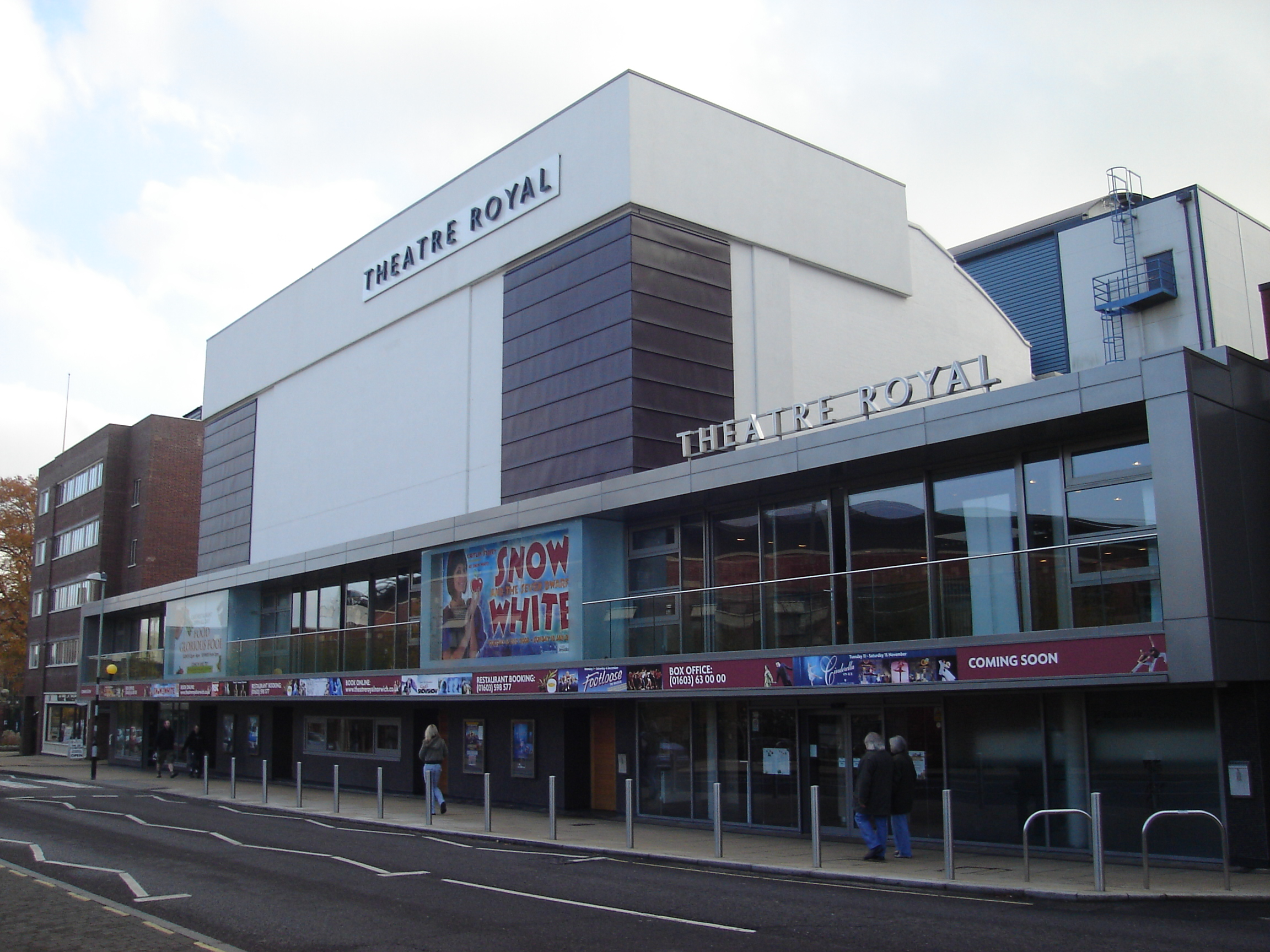
- Façade of the Theatre Royal (Theatre St)
- Interactive map of Norwich Theatre Royal
- Address: Theatre St, Norwich, Norfolk, UK
- Owner: Norwich Theatre
- Capacity: Main: 1,308 Stage Two: 200
- Type: Theatre

Construction
- Opened: 1758
- Rebuilt: 1801 and 1935
- Architect: Tim Foster Architects

Website
- https://norwichtheatre.org/

The Theatre Royal is a theatre in Norwich, Norfolk, England. It is one of the country's oldest established theatres, founded in 1758. It was rebuilt in 1801 and 1826. It burnt down in 1934 and was bombed during World War II.

Peter Wilson ran the theatre between 1992 and 2016. Stephen Crocker was appointed chief executive around 2016.

== History ==
The theatre was founded in 1758 by Norwich architect and investor Thomas Ivory, modelled on the Theatre Royal, Drury Lane. The building was capable of housing a maximum audience of one thousand in 1758. It was granted the title "Theatre Royal" by the Norwich Theatre Act 1768 (8 Geo. 3. c. 28), with rights to perform all drama. The Theatre Royal was rebuilt by William Wilkins in 1800 and again in 1826. (Note: The theatre announced its opening: "NEW THEATRE ROYAL, Will Open on EASTER MONDAY, March 27th on which occasion the RECEIPTS will be given in AID the SUBSCRIPTION for the RELIEF the UNEMPLOYED POOR. Previous the Plan, GOD SAVE THE KING BY THE WHOLE COMPANY. After which Sheridan's Comedy THE SCHOOL FOR SCANDAL. To conclude with the Musical Farce of YOUTH, LOVE, & FOLLY Or, The FEMALE JOCKEY. Norfolk Chronicle) Gas replaced candles and oil lamps in 1836. In 1894 the theatre was closed for several months in order to carry out a scheme of reconstruction and redecoration from the designs of Frank Matcham.

The "Theatre Royal" status attracted stars of the day to perform at the theatre. Sarah Siddons (1755–1831) performed the role of Hamlet, Juliet, and Lady Macbeth. African American Shakespearean actor Ira Aldridge performed at the theatre in January 1848.

The theatre owner's death in 1902 led to its auction. (Note: The Theatre Royal, Norwich, was put up for sale by auction on Wednesday at the Royal Hotel. Among those present were Messrs Fred Morgan (lessee), W. G. R. Sprague, J. W. Nightingale, Colonels Hill and Wood, Messrs George Gilbert, John Rout, C. Burn Boswell, and Harry Howlett. The biddings started at £3,000 and ran up to £4,800, at which sum the property was withdrawn, the auctioneer remarking that there was not much difference in the amount offered and the reserve bid. Lot 2, Mr Morgan’s lease, was withdrawn." The Era) In 1903 owner Fred Morgan sold the property to Mr Bostock and Mr Fitt and it was given the name Hippodrome for a year. In 1904 it was renamed at the Theatre Royal.

In the 20th century, actors such as Cary Grant, and Charlie Chaplin (with Fred Karno) performed on the boards.

The theatre burnt down in 1934 and just over a year later its successor was revealed. (Note: "NORWICH THEATRE Worthy Successor to the “Old Royal" FIFTEEN months ago the century-old Theatre Royal at Norwich was destroyed by fire, and while the ruins were smouldering Jack Gladwin commissioned his architect to prepare the plans for a new theatre. From the ashes of the old theatre has arisen so palatial a building that the sentimental regrets at the passing of the old are more than balanced by the great advantages of the new. Exteriorly, the new theatre is a handsome structure and a notable addition to a city possessing many architectural features. It is loftier and of far greater proportions than the old building, and of much greater seating capacity. The frontage, which will be floodlit, has the appearance of pale grey marble. The interior decorative scheme very modern and very attractive, and enhanced by the soft glow from concealed lighting. The large stage is equipped with every modern improvement. All the latest scene-shifting machinery is installed, and the dressing-rooms are planned to accommodate large companies. Norwich can now put on the biggest shows on the road. It will be opened on Monday by the Lord Mayor of the city (Percy Jewson)." The Era) In November Harry Lauder made his first visit to Norwich in 1935.

The building was bombed during World War Two. Audience numbers dwindled with the advent of cinema and then television. The theatre began showing films and boxing matches and later rock-and-roll performances.

The theatre was threatened with closure and the city council gathered a rescue package. In 1970 Dick Condon became the manager. Following his death Peter Wilson ran the theatre between 1992 and 2016. The theatre had a major refurbishment in 2007.

Stephen Crocker, a former deputy CEO of The Lowry theatre, followed as the chief executive.

== See also ==
- Norwich Playhouse
- Norfolk and Norwich Festival
- Maddermarket Theatre
- Sewell Barn Theatre
