= Life and Beth =

2008 play written by Alan Ayckbourn

- Written by: Alan Ayckbourn
- Characters: Beth; Gordon; Connie; David; Martin; Ella
- Original language: English
- Series: Things That Go Bump
- Subject: Ghosts, marriage, closure
- Genre: Comedy
- Setting: Beth's sitting room

Premiere
- Date premiered: 22 July 2008
- Place premiered: Stephen Joseph Theatre, Scarborough
- Official website

Life and Beth is a 2008 play by British playwright Alan Ayckbourn. It was written as a third part of a trilogy named Things That Go Bump, uniting the cast of the first two plays: Haunting Julia (1994) and Snake in the Grass (2002). It is about a recently bereaved widow, Beth, troubled by her family's misguided support and a late husband who won't leave her alone.

== Background ==
The history of this play dates back to 1994, when Haunting Julia was premièred. The cast was three men, but the play was dominated by Julia, once a gifted musician, now a ghost. In 2002, a female companion piece was premièred, named Snake in the Grass, with a cast of three women in a play dominated by the ghost of the father of two of them (and a much less savoury character than Julia). For some time, Alan Ayckbourn had considered writing a third play with a supernatural that combined the casts of these plays, but it was only after Susie Blake – Miriam in the original Snake in the Grass – contacted Ayckbourn about reprising her role that he said he would write this third play. This play was considerably lighter than the other two plays, and Ayckbourn considered it his equivalent to Noël Coward's Blithe Spirit.

This the first play to be written since Alan Ayckbourn's stroke in 2006. After the stroke, he doubted if he could return to writing, at some points considering giving it up and just directing. (If I Were You, the first new Ayckbourn play performed after his stroke, was written before the event.) He first revealed he was working on a new play in July 2007 Originally titled Life After Beth (it was originally set after when Beth was the dead character), the title changed prior to its completion in that summer, and it was first publicly announced that the play would be performed as part of the 2008 summer season at the Stephen Joseph Theatre December 2007. Two months later it was announced that Ayckbourn's other two "ghost" plays would also be performed in this season as part of the Things That Go Bump trilogy.

The play also coincided with Alan Ayckbourn's announcement that he was stepping down as artistic director of the Stephen Joseph Theatre. Although Alan Ayckbourn would continue to write and direct for the theatre, and this wasn't quite his last new play whilst artistic director (the last one being a musical Awaking Beauty), Life and Beth was nonetheless seen as his farewell performance.

== Characters ==
In keeping with the intention to combine the casts of the all-male Haunting Julia and all-female Snake in the Grass, there are six characters in the play. They are:

- Beth, a recently bereaved widow, very much subservient to her husband during their marriage but now living her own life;
- Gordon, Beth's late overbearing and pedantic husband, formerly a Health and Safety officer;
- Connie, Gordon's alcoholic sister, marginalised by her family in favour of her brother;
- David, the local vicar, with a badly-concealed longing for Beth;
- Martin, Gordon and Beth's son, well-meaning but inheriting all of the wrong attributes of Gordon;
- Ella, Martin's new chef girlfriend, overpowered by Martin's misplaced affection, silent (bar one exception) throughout the play.

The view that Beth cannot manage without Gordon is shared by most of the characters – Connie, David, Martin, and Gordon himself – with Beth alone in believing she's coping.

Life and Beth is the only play in the trilogy where a ghost is actually seen on stage, although it is never made completely clear whether he is a real ghost or just a figment of Beth's imagination.

== Setting ==
The entire play takes place in the living room of what was Gordon and Beth's house, now very much Beth's house, also temporarily doubling up as her bedroom whilst guests are present. There is also a hatchway to the kitchen where some of the action takes place.

The play takes place in two acts over 24 hours on Christmas. Act one takes place in a single scene on before dinner on Christmas Eve. Act Two takes place over two scenes: one scene overnight, and the second scene on the morning on Christmas Day.

The Stephen Joseph Theatre production originally staged this production in the round, as was the first stop of the tour at the New Vic, Stoke-on-Trent. The rest of the performances on the tour were re-staged for the proscenium.

It was originally intended to be the first Ayckbourn play featuring snow on stage, but this idea never made it into the final play.

== Synopsis ==
The play begin with Beth and Connie sitting watching carols on television. Connie, in a one-sided conversation, gives praises for her late brother, Gordon. She does not seem to mind she spent childhood in the shadow of her brother, blatantly the family favourite and given all the support she never had. Although Beth quietly agrees with Connie's idea of her idyllic marriage to Gordon, she expresses subtle annoyance with Connie's idea that the whole family will have to look after her this first Christmas alone, and Connie's hints of self-pity don't help either. Beth is more concerned about the disappearance of her cat, Wagstaff, who disappeared on the day of the funeral.

The local vicar who took the funeral, David, comes to supposedly give his condolences to Beth, and they discuss his death. Gordon was the Health and Safety officer for his company before he fell off a ladder trying to remove a man scared of heights. Gordon's injuries forced his early retirement and he later died from them. Once David starts talking about the death of his own wife, however, it transpires he has an obvious crush on Beth. Connie, at first interested in David herself (to the point of turning up to all his services), becomes more interested in matchmaking him to Beth when she mistakenly believes she is flirting back – giving the game away when Beth catches her eavesdropping at the hatchway. David persuades Beth, under duress, to let him say a prayer for her. After being interrupted by the arrival of Beth's son, Martin, and his new chef girlfriend, Ella, he says a prayer, commemorating Gordon, and then asking for help for Beth now Gordon has gone (his unsubtle way of suggesting they get together).

With David gone, Martin sets to work decorating the house with things Beth doesn't really want, such as an SUV-load of presents and a light-up reindeer on the front of the house, all in the name of idolising his father and his idea of Christmas. Meanwhile, he suffocates Ella with over-the-top affection, doing the talking for both of them. Ella remains morose and cringes whenever Martin embraces her. Whilst Ella nervously prepares dinner, Beth tries to keep Connie away from the wine. The dinner is a carefully arranged yet dubious salad that no-one really wants to eat. Martin tries to switch on the Christmas tree lights but ends up blowing a fuse. When the candle is lit, Gordon is sitting at his place on the table, and Beth faints.

In Act Two, Beth is preparing a sofa bed (having given her own room over to Martin and Ella.) She has also fixed the electrics herself. Martin comes down, requesting entry to the room by saying "Knock knock", something Beth informs him is an annoying habit (to no avail – he is doing it again later). He mentions he had a row with Ella, and Beth talks about her marriage to Gordon, but the key difference seems to be that is that whilst it took thirty year for Beth's marriage to become crushing, Martin seems to unwittingly do the same for all his girlfriends in a matter of days. The police then arrive returning Connie, whom Beth failed to keep sober. Instead of returning from David's midnight mass, she was arrested by the police trying to climb a statue of Oliver Cromwell (the previous year's incident being her attempt to ride the reindeer lights).

Finally left alone, Beth turns out the lights only to be kept awake by the glow of the reindeer lights. She then hears a scratching which is not, as she hoped, Wagstaff, but her late husband, entering with his own rendition of "Knock knock". Gordon, now holding an equally bureaucratic desk job in heaven, has returned to look after Beth forever – an unintended consequence, it transpires, of David's prayer asking Beth for help. It becomes clear that, before his death, Gordon micromanaged every part of Beth's life. Flatly refusing to consider Beth's suggestion not all of his help was wanted or that not all of their marriage was happy, he leaves, promising to come back tomorrow. Martin then returns with the news that Connie has been sick on the landing.

In the final scene, on Christmas morning, Martin and Ella are packing to leave, supposedly because Ella received an unexpected order for a large buffet. Before they go, Martin tells Ella to say goodbye, and for a moment it looks like Ella might speak, but instead she runs away crying. Connie, after returning from Mass, apologises with an annoying amount of worthlessness until Beth snaps and tells her, in the politest way, to shut up.

David arrives, called by Beth, and she asks if it is possible to reverse a prayer. A sceptical David agrees to say goodbye to Gordon, and during the prayer Gordon appears and challenges Beth to think if she can really manage without him. Beth shouts "Yes!" and a surprised Gordon vanishes. After David goes, Beth hears scratching from the hatch. Opening it, there is miaowing, half the items in the living room get knocked over, and the cushion in the cat basket is pressed down. Wagstaff, it seems, has returned.

== Productions ==
The original production at the Stephen Joseph Theatre had its first performance on 17 July 2008, and an opening night on 22 July April 2008, featuring the following cast:

- Beth – Liza Goddard
- Gordon – Adrian McLoughlin
- Connie – Susie Blake
- David – Ian Hogg
- Martin – Richard Stacey
- Ella – Ruth Gibson

The production team were:

- Director – Alan Ayckbourn
- Design – Pip Leckenby
- Lighting – Kath Geraghty
- Music – John Pattinson

This play, along with the other two Things That Go Bump plays Haunting Julia and Snake in the Grass toured to the New Vic, Stoke, retaining its setup in the round. The following year, the play was re-staged for the proscenium and toured alone to six further theatres. All the original cast took part in the end-stage tour except for Ian Hogg and Susie Blake, replaced by Terence Booth and Eileen Battye respectively.

== Critical reviews ==
Although the review of Life and Beth made mentions of Ayckbourn's upcoming departure as artistic director, they mostly concentrated on the play itself. They were broadly positive, though they stopped short of naming it one of Ayckbourn's best. Michael Billington in The Guardian wrote "Few dramatists in history have painted a more devastating picture of the emotional damage wrought by bullying men," and described Martin's misguided affection for his girlfriends as "an instant image of a grisly inheritance". Dominic Cavendish for The Daily Telegraph lauded the handling of death and bereavement with a light touch.

However, there was some disappointment that Life and Beth lacked the scariness of the first two parts of the trilogy. Also, Sam Marlowe, writing in The Times, although acknowledging the links with Blithe Spirit, opined that the characters weren't that believable. And in the Financial Times, Ian Shuttleworth, whilst highlighting several positives in the play, somewhat unkindly suggested Gordon might be Ayckbourn's caricature of himself hanging around the Stephen Joseph Theatre long after he should have departed.
