= Peter Wilson (theatre director) =

English theatre director and producer

Peter Wilson MBE (12 January 1951 - 4 September 2023) was an English theatre director and producer. Attending Exeter College, Oxford, he set up Peter Wilson Productions in 1983, which has run over 100 musicals and play in London's West End. He led the Theatre Royal, Norwich from 1992 to 2016, and transformed its fortunes. He was awarded an MBE for services to theatre in 2000. He is described as "one the West End’s most prolific and significant theatre producers".

== Background ==
Wilson was born on 12 January 1951 in London to Sir Geoffrey Wilson, a civil servant and a Quaker, and his American wife, Judy (née Trowbridge). Peter spent his early years in Sri Lanka and America, as the family followed Geoffrey in diplomatic postings. Peter attended Westminster School and travelled often to Washington, where his father was working at the time for the World Bank. Peter attained a first class degree in English at Exeter College, Oxford, where he became involved in theatre productions with the likes of Rowan Atkinson and Mel Smith. After a short while acting, Wilson chose to pursue a career behind the scenes, ditching his ideas of a career in law.

After Oxford Wilson spent three years at the Welsh Drama Company as assistant director, and then moved to the Bush Theatre. After working at Lyric Theatre in Hammersmith, Wilson created his own production company in 1983, Peter Wilson Productions, based in Brixton. It supported more than 500 productions worldwide, with over 100 plays and musicals in the West End. In 1992 he took over at the Theatre Royal in Norwich, which was facing bankruptcy. He ran the site until 2016. Over this time he built the theatre in membership and stature and transformed its fortunes, working with touring companies, including Glyndebourne Opera, The Northern Ballet and the Royal Shakespeare Company. He was the operator of the Arts Theatre in Leicester Square, London from 2019 until 2019.

Wilson's notable productions include The Woman in Black (1987), Stephen Daldry's National Theatre revival of JB Priestley's An Inspector Calls (1992) and Wagner's Ring Cycle (1997).

Stephen Fry stated that Wilson was "the crown prince of regional theatre", exemplifying "everything that is good about arts at the local and neighbourhood level, enlivening cultural institutions by attracting the best talent from outside." He is also described as "one the West End’s most prolific and significant theatre producers". The Woman in Black ran in the West End 33 years. Wilson was given Olivier award for his outstanding contribution: "unbelievable service and commitment to theatre" in the West End.

Wilson married Clare Stanham, a stage manager (1981), followed by divorce in 2000. Wilson died of cancer aged 72 on 4 September 2023. He is survived by his three children and two grandchildren.

== Honours ==
- 2000: MBE
- 2017 Honorary doctorate from the University of East Anglia in 2017
- 2020 Appointed vice lord lieutenant of Norfolk in 2020
- 2023 honorary Olivier Award
