= The Courtroom =

- Created by: Phil Redmond
- Country of origin: United Kingdom
- No. of episodes: 38

Production
- Running time: 30 minutes

Original release
- Network: Channel 4
- Release: 21 June – 16 December 2004

The Courtroom is a British legal drama created by Phil Redmond, which aired between June and December 2004. Music was composed and performed by Steve Wright.

The programme was notable for starring many former British soap stars, particularly those who starred in Redmond's other productions Brookside and Hollyoaks.

== Reception ==
Mark Lawson of The Guardian called the series "inferior". He also added in his review saying that the Granada television series Crown Court was better than The Courtroom.
