= Samantha Robinson (English actress) =

English actress

Samantha Robinson is an English actress.

== Early life ==
Growing up in Skelmersdale, Robinson attended Runshaw College and is listed as one of their 'notable alumni'.

== Theatre ==
After Runshaw, Robinson gained a place at Rose Bruford College and then went into work at Chichester Festival Theatre on Songs of the Western Man. She played Miranda in the Royal Exchange Theatres' production of The Tempest, alongside Pete Postlethwaite. She was a Laurence Olivier Bursary award winner in 2001.

Further credits include; Untouchable (Bush Theatre), The Owl Service (Plymouth Theatre Royal), which she starred in with her then boyfriend Dominic Colenso, The Lemon Princess (West Yorkshire Playhouse), the British premier of The Laramie Project (Sound Theatre, Leicester Square), A Taste of Honey (Oldham Coliseum), The Three Musketeers (Bristol Old Vic & New Vic), The House of Bernada Alba (Nuffield Theatre), Three Sisters on Hope Street (Hampstead Theatre), that was written by Tracy-Ann Oberman and Diane Samuels and directed by Lindsay Posner, Dead Heavy Fantastic (Liverpool Everyman), Hansel & Gretel (Corby Cube), The Phoenix of Madrid (Bath Theatre Royal), directed by Laurence Boswell, Order by Martin Derbyshire (Lantern Theatre) and Can't Stand Up For Falling Down by Richard Cameron, both directed by Ruth Carney, and The Grand Gesture (Northern Broadsides).

Robinson then toured with the 2017 stage revival of Rita, Sue and Bob Too by Andrea Dunbar. The play was the subject of some controversy as its three-week run at the Royal Court Theatre in January 2018 was initially cancelled by Vicky Featherstone in the wake of the #metoo campaign, but reinstated, receiving excellent reviews from the mainstream media.

== Film and television ==
Robinson's television credits include: PC Natalie Cryer in Five Days (BBC), Laura in The Girls Who Came to Stay (Granada),; Anna in Shameless (Channel Four); June Mahy in Island at War (Granada), and Lucy in Final Demand (BBC), plus Holby City, Becky Buckley in Doctors and Casualty.

== Radio ==
Robinson's radio credits include; Evaristo's Epitaph, Life with Lisa, The Believers (BBC Radio 4), and Shout to the Top, the first radio drama to be aired on BBC Radio 2, directed by Toby Swift.
