= GamePlan (play) =

2001 play by Alan Ayckbourn

- Programme cover from original SJT Production
- Written by: Alan Ayckbourn
- Characters: Sorrel Saxon; Lynette Saxon; Kelly Butcher; Leo Tyler; Dan Endicott; Grace Page; Troy Stephens
- Original language: English
- Series: Damsels in Distress
- Subject: Teenage prostitution
- Genre: Drama / comedy
- Setting: Lynette Saxon's flat, London Docklands, 2001

Premiere
- Date premiered: 24 May 2001
- Place premiered: Stephen Joseph Theatre, Scarborough
- Official website

GamePlan is a 2001 play by British playwright Alan Ayckbourn, the first in a trilogy of plays called Damsels in Distress (FlatSpin and RolePlay being parts two and three.) The darkest of the three plays, it is about a teenage girl who tries to support herself and her mother through prostitution.

== Background ==
GamePlan, along with FlatSpin, was originally intended to be part of a pair of plays, both set in the London Docklands, and both using the same cast of seven. Ayckbourn has a flat in the Docklands, where he observed that neighbours do not know each other well and strange things can happen under their noses. The pair of plays was eventually joined by a third, RolePlay, written as an afterthought, and the trilogy, Damsels in Distress, was shown in the Stephen Joseph Theatre's 2001 season. Like the other two plays, this drew some inspiration from the London Docklands.

This play was also a landmark in the progression of Ayckbourn's plays into darker and more contemporary material. Although contemporary subjects had been covered before, such as domestic violence in The Things We Do For Love, the subject of teenage prostitution was a new departure. It was still tame compared to the material now covered by other playwrights, but still arguably a gamble.

== Characters ==
As part of the Damsels in Distress trilogy, GamePlan was written to use the same seven actors as the other two plays in the series. In this play, the characters are:

- Sorrel Saxon, a sixteen-year-old schoolgirl
- Lynette Saxon, her mother, forty, former businesswoman, now a cleaner
- Kelly Butcher, Sorrel's friend, also sixteen
- Leo Tyler, a dapper retired dry cleaner and Sorrel's first client
- Dan Endicott, a detective police sergeant, forties
- Grace Page, a severe WPC, thirties
- Troy Stephens, a tabloid-quality journalist, thirties

Sorrel, Lynette and Kelly are the main characters in the play, with the other four making smaller appearances in single scenes.

== Setting ==
The entire play is set in Lynette Saxon's flat, on the riverside in the London Docklands. As part of Damsels in Distress, the play was written to use the identical set to the other two plays. As with most Ayckbourn plays, it was originally performed in the Round for its original production at the Stephen Joseph Theatre. However, it was adapted for the Proscenium for subsequent performances elsewhere.

The play is performed in two Acts. Both acts are divided into three scenes. The play takes place over a period of six weeks.

== Synopsis ==
The play opens at six in the morning with Sorrel Saxon catching her mother, Lynette, smoking. Lynette was a successful businesswoman, until business collapsed in the dotcom crash. She now cleans the offices she once managed (hence the early start and the smoking), whilst her husband ran off with her business partner to live abroad. Lynette mentions that they will not be able to afford the flat much longer, and contemplates moving out of London, in spite of Sorrel's protests.

Unknown to Lynette, Sorrel already has her own plan to make ends meet. After Lynette leaves, Sorrel's friend, Kelly Butcher, arrives. She is an unassertive girl who always agrees with Sorrel. Sorrel's idea is to make money as a high-class call girl. Sorrel's researches consists of the internet (in particular the codewords for different services – Sorrel intends to be "vanilla" or straight sex) and the rose-tinted story former classmate, Big Angie, who got chucked out of her school for doing the same. Sorrel seems convinced she knows what she is doing, and (as a result of her earlier experiences) sees sex as no big deal. Sorrel arm-twists Kelly to be her "maid", meeting the clients and helping if there's any trouble.

In the second scene, Sorrel prepares for her appointment with her first client, her plans now well advanced. To make herself untraceable, she has set up a website of lovechicks.co.uk, assumed a business name of "Mandy", and obtained a mobile phone exclusively for her business. This does not stop her receiving calls from prospective customers requesting disgusting acts. The client is one that Sorrel confidently believes won't cause any trouble.

The third scene takes place that evening. Kelly has brought, from her own savings, her maid's outfit, Sorrel's call girl underwear (so tight she can hardly breathe), and contraceptives. Then the client arrives. He is Leo Tyler, a mild-mannered man bearing flowers, tutting at the dirty magazines left for him, and more interested in talking about himself and his late wife. Sorrel's inexperience begins to show when she sprawls over the couch in an unsexy way. When Leo goes to the bedroom, she talks to Kelly about the noises call girls are supposed to make during sex, and starts to show doubts about the act. But with time short before Lynette returns home, this does not stop Sorrel going to the bedroom.

Kelly mistakes Sorrel's very bad fake orgasm noises, as Sorrel being attacked, and rushes in with a vase of flowers to brain Leo. With the confusion resolved, Sorrel and Leo carry on. Then Sorrels returns from the bedroom, in tears, hyperventilating. Leo, having evidently had his money's worth, returns to find himself alone in the living room. He quietly places the money on the table, and promptly has a heart attack and dies.

Act Two begins later that night. Lynette returns and senses Sorrel has problems, but Sorrel will not answer, nor discuss Lynette's own problems. Eventually, Lynette gives her a sleeping pill. In the middle of the night, Kelly comes back, and she and Sorrel quietly carry out Leo's body (which they hid earlier) and throw him over the balcony into the Thames. Just as they have done so, Lynette appears and asks questions. The two girls giggle helplessly, so she assumes it must be drugs.

The next scene takes place two weeks later. Sorrel has aborted her plan and has put it behind her, assuming she and Kelly are in the clear. She has got rid of the website and switched off her "work" mobile, using it only once when her own mobile runs out of battery. She has just finished the chat when Lynette comes in with a bottle of cheap pink bubbly and announces that she has finally got a job, as a publisher for a small religious book group. But before she can open the bottle, Lynette and Sorrel start another row.

But before the row end two police officers arrive at the door: Dan Endicott, who does the questioning, and Grace Page, who contributes Biblical quotations. They are investigating the death of Leo, and through tracing his internet use and where the body was found, they have narrowed down his whereabouts to this flat. When they question Lynette about the mobile number, she insists it's not hers or Sorrel's, but when they ring it, the mobile goes off. Lynette instantly responds by claiming she was the call girl, and Sorrel's attempted confession is ignored.

In the final scene, Kelly is helping Lynette and Sorrel pack to move, clearly in advanced stages as boxes now litter the whole flat. Although no-one was arrested (owing to the police failing to pin down exactly how Leo died), word has got round about Lynette's confession. Sorrel explains to Kelly that after being ostracised by her neighbours, Lynette appears to have given up. She has declined the job, and is moving to Doncaster for no better reason than once knowing some people who lived there.

A journalist then calls at the door, introducing himself as Troy Stephens, from a magazine (evidently a trashy one) called "As It Is", which is ironic as he wishes to run a story on Lynette Saxon turning to prostitution to support her daughter. Noticing Lynette's lack of enthusiasm, Troy mentions that a fee, which he shows her on a piece of paper. Lynette suggests she would say yes if they add a zero to the end of the figure. Troy goes outside to check with his office, whilst Lynette gets out the bottle of pink bubbly (left untouched since the police visit) on standby. She says that it probably won't be the answer they want, but there will be other chances. With the bottle ready, the play instantly ends just as the door opens, giving the impression that, whatever happens, the friendship of the three women will survive.

== Productions ==
The play was first performed at the Stephen Joseph Theatre, with an opening night on 24 May 2001, and a premiere on 29 May 2001. It featured the following cast:

=== Cast ===
- Lynette Saxon – Jacqueline King
- Sorrel Saxon – Saskia Butler
- Kelly Butcher – Alison Pargeter
- Leo Tyler – Robert Austin
- Dan Endicott – Tim Faraday
- Grace Page – Beth Tuckey
- Troy Stephens. – Bill Champion

=== Production team ===
- Director – Alan Ayckbourn
- Design – Roger Glossop
- Lighting – Mick Hughes
- Costumes – Christine Wall
- Music – Keith Jarrett

=== Tour ===
The production then toured. The first West End performance was at the Duchess Theatre, opening on 7 September 2001, and featured the same cast and production team. However, the success of RolePlay over the other two productions led to GamePlan being sidelined, along with FlatSpin, until eventually it was shown only once a week, to the disappointment of both Ayckbourn and the cast.

=== Subsequent productions ===
There were four subsequent professional productions of GamePlan between 2004 and 2008, as opposed to RolePlay which had only three.

== Critical reviews ==
Reviews of GamePlan were dominated by the decision of Ayckbourn to write a play on such a different area to his normal territory. Michael Billington of The Guardian wrote: "... his 58th and latest play strikes me as unsettling as anything he has written. What the Scarborough audience treated as a robust romp I took to be a cry of despair about the moral depths to which our society has sunk". The reviews were, on the whole, supportive of the change of tone. They also generally liked the concept of writing for a repertory company.

The opinions of the play itself, however, were more mixed. The reviews were generally favourable of the first half. John Peter, for The Sunday Times, praised the comedy scene where Sorrel tries to get Leo's attention with her unerotic gestures, but Michael Billington saw it as "the desperate pathos of a schoolgirl seeking to vamp an older man". The opinion of the second half was less favourable. Although some reviewers were satisfied with the way Ayckbourn had mixed the comedy and drama, most were unconvinced the mixture worked in such a dark situation. Jeremy Kingston wrote for The Times: "The two policemen are caricatures, and to make one of them prone to long biblical quotes is a pretty desperate attempt to flesh out a character", although the same scene was positively received by Dave Windass of The Stage.

When touring, GamePlan received further reviews as part of the whole Damsels in Distress trilogy. The trilogy as a whole received positive reviews, and GamePlan was generally deemed much stronger than FlatSpin, but most praise was reserved for RolePlay. This later led to the marginalisation of GamePlan and FlatSpin in favour of this play.

Alison Pargeter's role as Kelly Butcher contributed to her winning the Best Newcomer in the Critics' Circle Awards.
