= Alison Pargeter =

English actress

- Born: 31 May 1972 (age 54); Oxford, Oxfordshire, England
- Occupation: Actress
- Years active: 2000–present
- Television: Andor; You; The Nevers; Outlander; Rock & Chips; Mary Slessor; EastEnders

Alison Pargeter (born 31 May 1972) is an English actress who played the roles of Sarah Cairns in the BBC soap opera EastEnders, Mary Slessor in an 11-part television series of Mary Slessor, the Nag's Head barmaid called Val in the BBC Only Fools and Horses prequel Rock & Chips, She later played the role of Margaret Campbell in the third series of Starz's Outlander, Kindly Old Woman in the HBO series The Nevers, Dawn Brown in the Netflix series You and Aneth in the Disney Plus series Andor.

== Career ==
=== Television appearances ===
Pargeter has made several guest appearances over the years, she has appeared in the Channel 5 Horror series Urban Gothic, the long-running ITV police drama series The Bill, Strange, Dalziel and Pascoe, and Holby City.

Between that time in 2004, she played a recurring role which was Sarah Cairns in EastEnders, who appeared in 21 episodes, the character was a barmaid who worked in Angie's Den club, she started to become obsessed with Martin Fowler, and started to stalk him. The character tried to split Martin up from his wife Sonia Fowler following a drunken night together. The character exited the series following a fight where she accidentally stabbed Martin and got committed to a mental institution.

Since leaving EastEnders she moved back, and returned to doing guest appearances again, including The Courtroom, Love Soup, Channel 4 comedy series Green Wing, and returned for a second guest appearance in The Bill.

In 2008, Pargeter played another major the role called Mary Slessor in the Mary Slessor an 11-part television series.

Since then, she went back to doing guest appearances onces again, such as the Channel 4 comedy series Pete Versus Life, Rock & Chips, The Crimson Petal and the White, 24: Live Another Day inciding three guest roles in Doctors, Crashing, Outlander, The Dumping Ground, four guest roles in Casualty, Vanity Fair, Chernobyl, Catch-22, Father Brown, The Crown, The Nevers, Wedding Season, You, Ludwig and most recently Andor.

In 2004 she appeared in the television advertisement for John Smith's bitter "Annie, I'm not your Daddy" which starred Peter Kay. Also in 2012 she appeared in a television advertisement for Miracle Whip: Village. she later played a role as a house wife for TV commercial Volvic Juicy drink back in 2015, at the end of 2018, she appeared as playing the role of mother of three children with her husband as part of an Sainsbury's Christmas Advert, on a really important mission complete their Christmas shopping, In time for Christmas, and more recently, she played the role of a Vampire for an Birds Eye Commercial, advertising veggie burgers.

=== Films ===
Pargeter has appeared in nine films such as Calendar Girls (2003), Mad George (2004), Angel (2007), Reuniting the Rubins (2010), The National Union of Space People (2016), The Little Stranger (2018), Wonka (2023) ncluding upcoming movies called Queen at Sea (2026) and Shafted, which is currently still in pre-production.

=== Theatre ===
During 1997, Pargeter starred in the stage play Dinosaur Rock, and between 1999 and 2000, she ended up spending a year touring in the musical Grease playing the role of Jan who was one of the Pink Ladies.

Pargeter was a member of the Stephen Joseph Theatre Company in Scarborough, North Yorkshire, where she was directed by Sir Alan Ayckbourn in a trilogy of plays known collectively as Damsels in Distress, which subsequently transferred to the West End. For this, she won Best Newcomer in the Critics' Circle Theatre Awards and was nominated for an Evening Standard award, Manchester Evening News Award and a Whatsonstage Award.

Later parts include Sugar Daddies, again written and directed by Alan Ayckbourn; She Stoops to Conquer at the Royal Exchange, Manchester, for which she was nominated for a second Manchester Evening News award;

In June 2005, she played title role of Effie Gray in The Countess, playing opposite Nick Moran at the Criterion Theatre, Piccadilly.

In 2008 she recorded the voice of 'Wendy Darling' in a musical adaptation of Peter Pan with the music lyrics by Dallison/Wherry and was also narrated by Joe Parquale as 'Smee'.

Pargeter has starred in several Christmas Pantomimes for children over the years, she appeared in Alice in Wonderland, Jack and the Beanstalk and Cinderella.

In July 2011 Pargeter played the role of Gertrude Riall at the Manchester International Festival in a Victoria Wood's play called That Day We Sang.

Between February and June 2013, Pargeter went on A National Tour, touring eleven theatres around parts of the UK, and played the role of Eliante in the Roger McGough's play called The Misanthrope and on 10 March 2013 The Misanthrope also went live from the Everyman Playhouse and English Touring Theatre on BBC Radio 3.

Between 2013 and 2016, she appeared in two more stage plays including Sex Cells and her more recent was All My Sons.

== Filmography ==
=== Films ===
| Year | Film | Role | Notes |
|---|---|---|---|
| TBA | Shafted | Svetlana Gobbleoff | In pre-production |
| 2026 | Queen at Sea | Janise | |
| 2023 | Wonka | Wendy Chucklesworth | |
| 2018 | The Little Stranger | Maid | |
| 2016 | The National Union of Space People | Danielle Chief | |
| 2010 | Reuniting the Rubins | Nurse | |
| 2007 | Angel | Edwina | |
| 2004 | Mad George | Sandra | Short film |
| 2003 | Calendar Girls | Chemist's Assistant | |

=== Television ===
| Year | TV Show | Role | Notes |
|---|---|---|---|
| 2025 | Andor | Aneth | Episodes "Sagrona Teema", "Harvest" |
| 2024 | Ludwig | Debbie Williams | Episode 2 |
| 2023 | You | Dawn Brown | Recurring role, Season 4 |
| 2022 | Wedding Season | Claire | Episode 6 |
| 2021 | Holby City | Wendy Carrington | 4 episodes |
| 2021 | The Nevers | Kindly Old Woman | Episodes "Exposure", "Ignition" |
| 2020 | The Crown | Buckingham Palace Maid 1 | Episodes "Fagan", "War" |
| 2020 | Father Brown | Anna Bailey | Series 8, episode 6 "The Numbers of the Beast" |
| 2019 | Catch-22 | Nurse Cramer | Episode 6 |
| 2019 | Chernobyl | BCP HQ Aide Female | "Please Remain Calm" |
| 2018 | Vanity Fair | Glorvina O'Dowd | Episodes "In Which a Painter's Daughter Meets a King", "Endings and Beginnings" |
| 2018 | Casualty | Theresa Jordons | 1 episode |
| 2017 | The Dumping Ground | Janet Umbleby | Episodes "Back in the Game - Part 1", "Back in the Game - Part 2", "The Fairytale Princess", "Save the DG", "What Lies Beneath" |
| 2017 | Outlander | Margaret Campbell | Episodes "Creme de Menthe", "The Bakra" "Eye of the Storm" |
| 2016 | Crashing | Nurse | Episode 6 |
| 2015 | Casualty | Flo Hill | Episode "Maybe This Year" |
| 2015 | Suspicion | Anita | Episode "Death Next Door" |
| 2014 | Quiet Desperation | Gabby | Pilot |
| 2014 | Doctors | Matilda | Episodes "The Moon Girl Chronicles: Part One", "The Moon Girl Chronicles: Part Two", "Love is a Battlefield" |
| 2014 | 24: Live Another Day | Lydia | Episode "10:00 p.m.-11:00 a.m." |
| 2013 | Toast of London | Senna Poddington | Episode "Vanity Project" |
| 2012 | Doctors | Annie Hanks | Episode "Ticks and Twitches" |
| 2010–2011 | Rock & Chips | Val | Episodes Pilot Special, "Five Gold Rings", "The Frog and the Pussycat" |
| 2011 | The Crimson Petal and the White | Amelia | TV mini-series, Episode 4 |
| 2010 | Pete versus Life | Valerie | Episode "Ollie's Girlfriend" |
| 2009 | Casualty | Rosie Pullen | Episode "Could We Be Heroes?" |
| 2008 | Doctors | Nina Jarvis | Episode "I Know What You Did Last Semester" |
| 2008 | Mary Slessor | Mary Slessor | 11 episodes |
| 2007 | The Bill | Shelley Cooper | Episodes "Line of Fire: Part 1", "Line of Fire: Part 2" |
| 2006 | Casualty | Donna Carlyle | Episode "In Good Faith" |
| 2006 | Green Wing | Nurse | Series 2, episode 1 |
| 2005 | Love Soup | Siobhan | Episode "There Must Be Some Way Out of Here" |
| 2004 | The Courtroom | Deborah Harker | Episodes "Five Below Zero", "Zero" |
| 2004 | EastEnders | Sarah Cairns | 21 episodes |
| 2004 | Holby City | Sylvia Dyson | Episode "The Kindness of Strangers" |
| 2004 | Dalziel and Pascoe | Barmaid | Episode "A Game of Soldiers" |
| 2003 | Strange | Natalie | Episode "Incubus" |
| 2001 | The Bill | Katie | Episode "Billy the Kid" |
| 2000 | Urban Gothic | Leila Haze | Episode "Sum of the Parts" |
