= Damsels in Distress (plays) =

Trilogy of plays by Alan Ayckbourn

Damsels in Distress (trilogy)
- Programme cover from touring version of SJT production
- Written by: Alan Ayckbourn
- Characters: Troy Stephens / Sam Berryman / Justin Lazenby Sorrel Saxon / Tracy Taylor / Julie-Ann Jobson Kelly Butcher / Rosie Seymour / Paige Petite Dan Endicott / Tommy Angel / Micky Rale Leo Tyler / Maurice Whickett / Derek Jobson Grace Page / Edna Stricken / Dee Jobson Lynette Saxon / Annette Sefton-Wilcox / Arabella Lazenby
- Original language: English
- Subject: Various
- Genre: Various
- Setting: Various flats, London Docklands, 2001

Premiere
- Date premiered: 24 May 2001 (GamePlan), 3 July 2001 (FlatSpin), 4 September 2001 (RolePlay)
- Place premiered: Stephen Joseph Theatre, Scarborough
- Official website

Damsels in Distress is a trilogy of plays written in 2001 by British playwright Alan Ayckbourn. The three plays, GamePlan, FlatSpin and RolePlay, were originally performed as a set by the Stephen Joseph Theatre Company (SJT). The plays were written to be performed by the same seven actors using the same set. Although the plays loosely shared some common themes, the three stories were independent of each other and unconnected.

This trilogy is considered Alan Ayckbourn's first major success of the 21st century. It also began a dispute between Ayckbourn and the West End.

== Background ==
Damsels in Distress began as an experiment to revive the Stephen Joseph Theatre's repertory system. Throughout the theatre's time at its first two venues, plays had largely been staged on a repertory basis, with plays being chosen and written around the actors available. After the move to the theatre's current venue in 1996, however, the system largely ended (apart from the 10×10 season in 1998), with the theatre relying more on actors hired for single roles. Partly because of this, and partly because of the ongoing financial pressure on the theatre, in 2001 Ayckbourn chose to write a set of plays which could be performed by the same company of seven actors available at the time. This included three long-standing SJT performers (Robert Austin, Jacqueline King and Bill Champion), two recent additions (Alison Pargeter and Saskia Butler) and two newcomers (Beth Tuckey and Tim Faraday).

It was originally planned for Damsels in Distress to be two plays, GamePlan and FlatSpin. Indeed, this remained the intention when GamePlan was premiered in May. It was only during rehearsals for FlatSpin when Ayckbourn considered the "company" effect to take hold, and the idea for a third play started to emerge. After getting agreement from the cast to take on a third play, it was written in the week after FlatSpin began performances, and the summer programme was rescheduled to include this play, RolePlay, late in the season.

As well as sharing the same seven actors, the trilogy was also written to use the same set: a flat in the London Docklands, where Ayckbourn himself owns a flat. Beyond that, there was no intentional link between the plays, and the only reason the name Damsels in Distress was chosen was that the plays all happened to include a female character in some sort of trouble. However, there were nonetheless a number of common themes that arose from the plays' settings: flats owned by well-to-do Londoners who know little of who their neighbours are or what they do; and seedy vices left behind from London's old East End coming back to haunt them. The plays also shared themes common to most Ayckbourn plays.

== Characters ==
Each of the three plays has its own cast of seven characters. In the original production, the twenty-one characters were cast as follows:

Actor in original production	Actor required	GamePlan	FlatSpin	RolePlay
Bill Champion	Male, younger	Troy Stephens	Sam Berryman	Justin Lazenby
Saskia Butler	Female, younger	Sorrel Saxon	Tracy Taylor	Julie-Ann Jobson
Alison Pargeter	Female, younger	Kelly Butcher	Rosie Seymour	Paige Petite
Tim Faraday	Male, older	Dan Endicott	Tommy Angel	Micky Rale
Robert Austin	Male, older	Leo Tyler	Maurice Whickett	Derek Jobson
Beth Tuckley	Female, older	Grace Page	Edna Stricken	Dee Jobson
Jacqueline King	Female, older	Lynette Saxon	Annette Sefton-Wilcox	Arabella Lazenby

== Setting ==
All three plays are single-scene plays, written to use the same set of a flat in the London Docklands, although each play is set in a different flat. The set includes a living area, kitchen and balcony over the river, all of which have different functions in different plays. The plays were performed in the round for their original productions at the Stephen Joseph Theatre. However, in subsequent productions elsewhere they were re-staged for the proscenium.

== The Plays ==
=== GamePlan ===
The first play, GamePlan, is the darkest of the three, and covers the theme of teenage prostitution – a theme far more contemporary than those often expected from Ayckbourn plays. The play centres on Lynette Saxon, a once-successful dotcom businesswoman now reduced to cleaning the offices she once managed, her 16-year-old daughter Sorrel, and Sorrel's friend, Kelly Butcher. Sorrel intends to support herself and her mother by setting herself up as a high-class call girl (inspired by a somewhat romanticised account from a former pupil), and enlists Kelly as her "maid". Sorrel is convinced she has everything worked out and does not see selling sex as a big deal. However, Sorrel's plan starts to unravel when her first client arrives, especially after he dies of a heart attack in her mother's flat.

=== FlatSpin ===
The second play, FlatSpin, is a comedy thriller. Rosie Seymour is an out-of-work actress openly desperate for a job and a man. She is house-sitting for a flat owned by a Joanna Rupelford, when a handsome stranger, Sam Berryman, arrives and eventually tells her she is the most beautiful woman he has ever met and asks her out on a date, even though he appears to have mistaken her for the flat's owner. Rosie, going along with this assumed identity, allows Sam back to the flat that evening to cook her dinner. The date is going extraordinarily well until Sam is suddenly called away, only for a couple of heavies to return with Sam later. It turns out that Sam, the heavies and the flat are all part of an elaborate drugs sting due to take place that evening. With Rosie having shown herself to the drug courier they intend to entrap, Rosie is talked into doing the sting herself.

=== RolePlay ===
RolePlay was the play written as the afterthought, but turned out to be the most successful play of the three. The play centres on a dinner party held by Justin Lazenby and Julie-Ann Jobson, where they intend to announce their engagement. Before the dinner begins, there are already signs of tension: Julie-Ann gets overly frantic about making the meal perfect for her parents (her father, it later turns out, is a right-wing bigot), and Justin's alcoholic mother is clearly going to arrive paralytic. However, the biggest complication turns out to be when Paige Petite climbs onto the balcony, on the run from her violent boyfriend. Trapped in the flat by her minder, Justin and Julie-Ann are forced to keep up appearances during the dinner whilst the stand-off is played out.

== Productions ==
Programme cover for West End version of trilogy at Duchess Theatre

GamePlan premiered at the Stephen Joseph Theatre on 24 May 2001, followed by FlatSpin on 3 July 2001 and RolePlay on 4 September 2001. The production team for all three plays was:

- Director – Alan Ayckbourn
- Design – Roger Glossop
- Lighting – Mick Hughes
- Costumes – Christine Wall
- Music – Keith Jarrett

The three plays then toured, including a return to the Stephen Joseph Theatre to compensate for the earlier short run of RolePlay. The trilogy was chosen as the inaugural productions for the newly built Gala Theatre in Durham in January 2002.

The plays began a West End run at the Duchess Theatre on 7 September 2002, with the same cast and production team. However, the success of RolePlay over led to play's producers, the Really Useful Group, gradually reducing the number of performances of the other two plays. Finally, it was decided to stage only RolePlay during the week, with the other two staged only during the day on a Saturday as part of the whole trilogy. This caused considerable upset amongst the cast and led to a long-standing rift with the West End in general.

All three plays have received further performances by other theatre companies since, but, so far, no professional theatre has attempted to re-stage the whole trilogy.

== Critical Reviews ==
Further details in review sections on individual GamePlan, FlatSpin and RolePlay pages.

GamePlan was reviewed first. The critics reacted positively to the concept of a return to repertory theatre, and the departure to more contemporary themes, although they were split on how good GamePlan was as a play. FlatSpin received relatively little attention as an individual play, with most critics choosing to review it as part of the set along with RolePlay. When RolePlay was reviewed, it received unanimous praise from the critics. The trilogy as a whole then received further praise throughout its tour and West End performances, with Michael Billington of The Guardian dubbing the cast "The Magnificent Seven". FlatSpin was generally considered the weakest of the three, and RolePlay the strongest.

Alison Pargeter won Best Newcomer in the Critics' Circle Theatre Awards for her roles of Kelly Butcher, Rosie Seymour and Paige Petite.

== West End dispute ==
The upset caused by the sidelining of GamePlan and FlatSpin in favour of RolePlay finally came to public attention in October 2002. Shortly after the end of the West End production, at the Orange World lecture at the Apollo Theatre, Michael Billington asked Alan Ayckbourn about the state of the West End. Ayckbourn responded by expressing his dissatisfaction with the commercial producers who, in his words, "condemned two of the parts to the dustbin," and said of the West End in general "If all we are looking for these days is one-shot plays with one big name in it, I don't want to be part of it." This was widely reported as Alan Ayckbourn threatening to boycott the West End.

Ayckbourn also heavily criticised the West End for casting cinema, pop and television stars instead of theatre actors, particularly their lack of voice projection. He singled out his harshest criticism for casting Madonna in David Williamson's Up for Grabs, saying "You might as well have put her on stage eating a plate of spaghetti and put a rope round her chair instead of putting her in a theatre where she wasn't at home and was struggling."

Although a "boycott" was not what Ayckbourn said word-for-word, the effect was broadly the same. The following year, Ayckbourn suggested he might return to the West End on condition that plays were staged on his terms, and this was interpreted as a sign that his latest play, Sugar Daddies, would get a West End performance. But this did not happen, and the closest performance to London was at the Yvonne Arnaud Theatre in Guildford. In 2005, Private Fears in Public Places also omitted the West End from its run, instead choosing to perform at the Outer London venue of the Orange Tree Theatre, in Richmond. Ayckbourn has continued to criticise the West End frequently, and has said he does not expect to direct at the West End again (except, if asked, at the National Theatre where he spent a two-year sabbatical).

In 2007, he relaxed the boycott to allow other directors to direct his "classic" plays in the West End again, although his moratorium on the recent plays remained, and Absurd Person Singular was performed at the Garrick Theatre. The following year, he allowed The Norman Conquests to be revived at The Old Vic, which went to the length of re-staging the theatre in the round, as the play was originally intended.

He finally allowed a return to the West End as a director with a revival of Woman in Mind starring Janie Dee. This revival, first staged at the Stephen Joseph Theatre in September 2008, ran in early 2009 at the Vaudeville Theatre, where the original London première was performed in 1986.
