= Jacqueline King =

British stage and television actress

- Occupation: Actress
- Years active: 1978–present
- Notable work: Writers Retreat; House of Saddam; GamePlan
- Television: Doctors; Coronation Street; Midsomer Murders; Doctor Who

Jacqueline King is a British stage and television actress known for her role in Alan Ayckbourn's theatre production of GamePlan and as recurring character Sylvia Noble in Doctor Who (2006; 2008–2010; 2023).

== Career ==
King trained at the Bristol Old Vic Theatre School. After training, she worked as an actor in Africa, Canada, America, Sri Lanka, and UAE.

On returning to the UK, she appeared in several Alan Ayckbourn productions, including the original runs of Comic Potential (1999) and the Damsels in Distress trilogy (2001–2002). King went on to appear at the Orange Tree Theatre in productions of The Madras House, Press Cuttings, Major Barbara and Larkin with Women.

King has made several television appearances, including roles in Hetty Wainthropp Investigates, Casualty, Life Begins, Lawless and Doctors (as recurring character Wendy Sheffield).

From 2004 to 2005 King had a regular role in the BBC crime drama series 55 Degrees North, as Georgina Hodge, alongside Don Gilet and Dervla Kirwan. In 2006 she appeared in two episodes of The Bill, as Ella Whittaker; and was cast in Doctor Who as Sylvia Noble, the overbearing, widowed mother of Catherine Tate’s character Donna Noble. She has reprised the role twice in the 2008 series, in a two-part special broadcast over the 2009 Christmas period, and since 2018 in audio productions for Big Finish Productions. In 2007, she appeared in House of Saddam, playing real-life diplomat April Glaspie. 2009 also saw her appear in one episode of Missing, alongside Pauline Quirke.

== Filmography ==
=== Film ===
Year	Title	Role	Notes
1989	First and Last	Receptionist	TV film
1997	The Student Prince	The Master's Wife	TV film
1997	Deacon Brodie	Nursing Assistant	TV film
2001	Gabriel & Me	Mrs. Peacock	
2004	Lawless	Kate Chambers	TV film
2006	Desperate Crossing – The Untold Story of the Mayflower	Mrs. Brewster	
2015	Writers Retreat	Trinë	
2017	Theresa vs Boris: How May Became PM	Theresa May	TV film documentary

=== Television ===
Year	Title	Role	Notes
1982	The New Adventure of Lucky Jim	Barmaid	Episode: "The Ties That Bind"
1983	Andy Robson	Jenny Cowen	Episode: "Lost and Found"
1987	Late Expectations	Miss Jopling	1 episode
1996	The Bill	Ros Fairburn	Episode: "Mirror Image"
1998	Hetty Wainthropp Investigates	Connie	Episode: "Something to Treasure"
2001	Casualty	Fiona Lytton	2 episodes
2004	Life Begins	Josie	Episode: "Maggie & Phil"
2004–2005	55 Degrees North	Georgina Hodge	Series regular
2005	Doctors	Marilyn Curtis	Episode: "Relative Stress"
2006	The Bill	Ella Whittaker	2 episodes
2006, 2008–2010, 2023	Doctor Who	Sylvia Noble	Recurring role
2007	Doctors	Wendy Sheffield	4 episodes
2008	House of Saddam	April Glaspie	TV mini-series
2009	Missing	Irene Laird	1 episode
2010	Come Fly with Me	Mrs. Ross	1 episode
2011–2012	Coronation Street	Norma Fountain	4 episodes
2012	Inspector George Gently	Magistrate	Episode: "Gently in the Cathedral"
2013	Doctors	Noreen Fullerton	Episode: "Bittersweet"
2014	Midsomer Murders	Laura Wilding	Episode: "The Flying Club"
2014	Silk	Magistrates Court Judge 2	1 episode
2014	Holby City	Olive Fincher	Episode: "Bounce Back"
2014	Give Out Girls	Auntie Faye	Episode: "Hot Boy"
2017	Bounty Hunters	Penelope	2 episodes
2018	Silent Witness	Lindy Muddyman	Episode: "One Day"
2019	Doctors	Finn Kennedy	Episode: "Goodnight Sweetheart"
2019	Turn Up Charlie	Mrs. Hutch	1 episode
2020	The Duchess	Evan's mum	Episode 3
2020	Adult Material	Judge	2 episodes
2022	Mammals	Trish Buckingham	2 episodes
