= The Woman in Black (play) =

1987 stage play

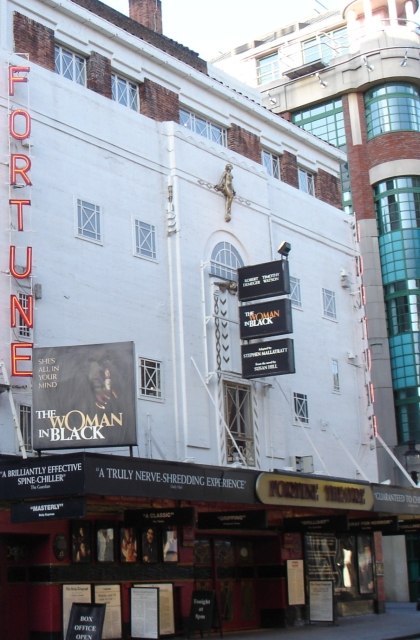
- Fortune Theatre
- Written by: Susan Hill; Stephen Mallatratt (adaptation)
- Genre: Horror story, ghost story
- Setting: North eastern Britain

Premiere
- Date: 1987 (Scarborough); 1989 (London)

The Woman in Black is a two-act stage play adapted by Stephen Mallatratt from Susan Hill's novel of the same name. The play was produced by PW Productions, led by Peter Wilson. It is notable for only having three actors perform the whole play. It was first performed at the Stephen Joseph Theatre in Scarborough, in 1987. The production opened in London's West End in 1989 and was performed there until 4 March 2023 for 13,232 performances, becoming the second longest-running non-musical play in West End history, after The Mousetrap.

== Plot summary ==
=== Act I ===
In an empty Victorian theatre, an old Arthur Kipps is reading aloud from a manuscript of his story. A young actor, whom he hired to help dramatise the tale, enters and criticises him for his rigid delivery. After a debate, they agree to perform the story, with the Actor playing a younger Kipps, and Kipps himself playing all the other characters and narrating the play.

Young Kipps learns of the death of the elderly and reclusive widow, Mrs. Drablow. He travels to Crythin Gifford to sort through her private papers. On the train, he meets a local landowner, Mr. Samuel Daily, who tells him a little about Mrs. Drablow. Upon their arrival at Crythin Gifford, Mr. Daily drops off Arthur at the local inn where he is to stay the night.

The next morning, young Arthur meets with a local man enlisted to help him, Mr. Horatio Jerome. They go to Mrs. Drablow's funeral together, where Arthur sees a woman, standing alone and dressed all in black. At first feeling sympathy for the young woman, who appears to be suffering from a wasting disease, he asks Mr. Jerome who she is. Mr. Jerome is visibly uncomfortable and forces Arthur away from the church, insisting that there was no woman. After their return to the inn, Mr. Jerome's mood lifts and says that a local man will arrive shortly to escort Arthur to Mrs. Drablow's house.

The local man, a villager named Keckwick, arrives a few moments later. To Arthur's delight, Keckwick drives Arthur in an old-fashioned pony and trap out to the house. Arthur spends the day sorting through Mrs. Drablow's papers and is amazed to find out how many there are. He also finds an old cemetery outside the house, where he again sees the Woman in Black. Later that day, a thick fog settles on the marsh, cutting Arthur off from the mainland. He tries to return across the causeway on foot in the fog, but quickly becomes lost and is forced to retrace his steps to Eel Marsh House. Before he gets there, he hears the sound of a pony and trap on the causeway.

Assuming that it is Keckwick returning, he turns back into the fog. It soon becomes apparent that the pony and trap are in trouble, and he hears it drive off the causeway onto the marsh. Arthur listens helplessly as the pony and trap get stuck in the mire and its occupants, including a young child, are drowned. Arthur returns to the house in a state of panic. Whilst he is exploring the house, he discovers a locked door. Due to stress, he becomes enraged when he is unable to open it. He is surprised when Keckwick returns a few hours later.

Act I ends with a monologue from young Arthur in which he explains that he is sure, although he does not know how, that the sounds he heard were from neither Keckwick nor any living thing, but from things that are dead.

=== Act II ===
Arthur seeks the help of Mr. Jerome, either to accompany him back to Eel Marsh House or to send him someone else to help. Mr. Jerome becomes severely distressed and insists that nobody in the village would willingly accompany him to the house. Arthur later meets Sam Daily and tells him of his experiences. Sam is concerned and invites Arthur to his house, where he gives Arthur his dog, Spider, as a companion.

Returning to Eel Marsh House, Arthur finds that the locked room is a child's nursery, abandoned but in perfect condition. Later that night, he hears a knocking sound in the nursery. He and Spider investigate. The nursery has been ransacked, and an empty rocking chair is rocking back and forth as if somebody had just left it. Arthur gingerly returns to his bedroom.

The next day, Arthur finds correspondence from almost sixty years ago, between Mrs. Drablow and a mysterious woman who is apparently her sister. The woman, Jennet Humfrye, unmarried and with child, was sent away by her family. A son was born to her in Scotland, and her family immediately pressured her to give him up for adoption. Despite her strong resistance, Jennet ultimately relented and gave the child to Mrs. Drablow and her husband.

Unable to accept being parted from her son, Jennet returned to Crythin Gifford after a time and stayed with her sister. She was allowed to see her son provided that she never reveal her true relationship to him. The child became attached to Jennet, and she planned to run away with him, but before she could follow through the plan, a tragic event occurred. The child, his nursemaid, and his dog went out onto the marsh one day in a pony and trap driven by Keckwick's father. A fog suddenly descended upon the marsh and they became lost. Riding blindly, they became stuck in the quicksand, and all were drowned. Jennet, driven insane by grief, contracted a terrible wasting disease and died several years later. Immediately after her death, her spirit returned as the Woman in Black.

Arthur suddenly becomes victim to a series of chilling events in Eel Marsh House and eventually passes out on the marsh when trying to rescue Spider. He is found and taken back to Crythin by Sam Daily, who assures him that Spider survived. He tells Arthur the story of the Woman and explains that many of the local people he has met (Jerome, Keckwick, and Daily himself) have all lost a child after seeing her.

Kipps returns to London and marries his fiancée, Stella. At a country fair, Stella and their young son Joseph go for a ride on a pony and trap. Suddenly, Arthur sees the Woman in Black, who steps in front of the trap, scaring the pony. Joseph is thrown from the trap and hits a tree, killing him instantly. Stella dies 10 months later due to injuries sustained in the accident.

Having come to the end of their rehearsal, Kipps and the Actor sit down to rest. Kipps wonders if performing the play for his family will exorcise Jennet's ghost. However, the Actor asks Kipps about the "pale young lady with the wasted face" playing the Woman in Black. Mirroring the earlier scene with Mr. Jerome, a terrified Kipps reveals that nobody else had been in the theatre but them, implying that the real Woman in Black had been present. Remembering his own wife and child, the Actor runs offstage in horror. The play ends with the rhythmic knocking of the rocking chair as the lights fade to black. An image of the face of the Woman in Black lingers behind the gauze for a few seconds.

== Production history ==
The play premiered in 1987 at the Stephen Joseph Theatre in Scarborough as a Christmas ghost story. The production was staged in a pub and was later retooled as a traditional proscenium staging for its London transfer.

In late 1988 the play was staged at the Birmingham Rep Studio. This production was in Traverse stage format, with the action taking place between two facing blocks of audience seating on the studio floor, and on a balcony at one end.

The play opened in the West End at the Lyric Hammersmith in January 1989, then moved to the Strand Theatre in February 1989 and subsequently transferred to the Playhouse in April 1989 and finally the Fortune Theatre in August 1989. Direction was by Robin Herford, the Set Designer was Michael Holt and the Lighting Designer was Kevin Sleep. The original London cast (1989) was Charles Kay as Arthur Kipps and John Duttine as The Actor. In publicity literature, the actress in the title role is surreptitiously listed as 'Vision', but was originally Bristol Old Vic Theatre School-trained Nicola Sloane. For the 30th Anniversary year the West End cast from May 2018-March 2019 was Richard Hope as Arthur Kipps and Mark Hawkins as the Actor, then from 19 March 2019 Stuart Fox with Matthew Spencer.

Following the closure of the theatre due to the COVID-19 pandemic in the United Kingdom, the show reopened on 15 September 2021 and saw both Terence Wilton and Max Hutchinson returning to play respectively Arthur Kipps and The Actor.

On 9 November 2022, it was announced that the show would play its last performance at the Fortune Theatre on Saturday 4 March 2023. The final cast starred Julian Forsyth as Kipps and Matthew Spencer as The Actor. Upon closing, the production had played 13,232 performances and was the fourth longest running show in West End history and the second longest running play in West End history. Following its final West End performance in March 2023, the production transferred to a new UK Tour, opening at the Wolverhampton Grand Theatre in September 2023.

=== Kenya ===
The first overseas production of the play was at the Phoenix Theatre in Nairobi from 21 September to 6 October 1990. Arthur Kipps was played by James Ward and The Actor by Martin Worster, produced by James Ward and Gideon Nzoka. There were 14 performances, and reviews in The Standard, The Chronicle and The Daily Nation were all glowing.

=== United States ===
After a run at the Old Globe Theatre in San Diego, the play had its New York City debut at the Minetta Lane Theatre opening on 4 June 2001 directed by Patrick Garland and starring Keith Baxter as Kipps and Jared Reed as The Actor. Lighting design by Ken Billington. The production closed on 8 July 2001 after 8 previews and 40 performances.

In 2018, Herford presented the first U.S. staging of his West End direction at the Royal George Theatre in Chicago, Illinois. The production opened on 18 November and ran through 17 February of the following year, starring Bradley Armacost and Adam Wesley Brown.

In 2020, the play returned to New York City under the direction of Herford. Staged at the McKittrick Hotel, the production recreated the original 1987 Scarborough bar staging in the McKittrick's Club Car. It starred Ben Porter as The Actor and David Acton as Kipps. Originally opening on 23 January 2020, it closed due to the COVID-19 pandemic in the United States. It reopened on 24 October 2021 and closed on 27 February 2022. Combining both runs, it played 22 previews and 166 performances. The production received the Best Play Revival Award from the Off-Broadway Alliance and was nominated for three Drama League Awards: Outstanding Play Revival and Distinguished Performance for Porter and Acton. As of 2025, the production, still featuring Ben Porter and David Acton, is touring North America produced by Pemberley Productions.

=== Australia ===
In 2006–2007, a production starring John Waters and Brett Tucker toured Australia, Hong Kong and New Zealand.

The play was also performed at Sydney's Ensemble Theatre in 2021.

A new national tour in 2024 starred John Waters and Daniel MacPherson.

=== Canada ===
In Oct-Nov 2024, the play was performed at the Firehall Theatre in Niagara Falls. Directed by Laurel Candler, the production starred Paul Wintemute as Kipps and Sam Donovan as The Actor.
