= Stephen Mallatratt =

British dramatist and actor (1947–2004)

- Born: Nigel Stephen Mallatratt; 15 June 1947; London, England
- Died: 22 November 2004 (aged 57); Bristol, England
- Occupations: Playwright, television screenwriter and actor
- Notable credit(s): TV: Coronation Street, The Forsyte Saga (2002) and Island at War (2004); Stage: The Woman in Black

Nigel Stephen Mallatratt (15 June 1947 – 22 November 2004) was an English playwright, television screenwriter and actor. He is best known for his television work on the ITV series Coronation Street, The Forsyte Saga (2002) and Island at War (2004), and for his stage play The Woman in Black – adapted from the novel of the same name by Susan Hill – which ran in the West End from 1989 to 2023. He was also an actor, appearing in minor roles in Chariots of Fire and Brideshead Revisited.

== Early life ==
Born on 15 June 1947 in Mill Hill, London, England, Mallatratt originated from a lower-middle-class background. As a child, he was a pupil at Orange Hill Grammar School in Edgware, where he excelled at drama, English, and swimming. He was feted for his performances in school plays. Among his various roles, he played Petruchio in Shakespeare's The Taming of the Shrew with his manservant, Grumio, played by David Troughton. He was considered Oxbridge material but instead briefly entered the building trade, prior to becoming involved in acting.

His father, Howard Mallatratt, was a well-known figure in Mill Hill, with a splendid military moustache and a facial tic acquired from shell shock during World War II. He was a leading player for Mill Hill Village Cricket Club.

== Acting career ==
His love of acting was sparked in his teenage years when watching a performance at the Watford Palace Theatre. In 1968, he entered Central School of Speech and Drama, graduating in 1971. After his studies, he joined the Ipswich theatre, and later the Stephen Joseph Theatre, in Scarborough, at the invitation of actor and playwright Alan Ayckbourn. While in Scarborough, he appeared in several productions, including Absent Friends, Bedroom Farce, The Breadwinners and The Brontes of Haworth, by Christopher Fry, in 1985.

== Personal life and death ==
Mallatratt was married three times, to Vanessa Mallatratt, Eileen O'Brien and stage manager Emma London. He had a daughter, Hannah, with O'Brien.

He died of leukaemia in 2004 at the age of 57, in Bristol.

== Filmography ==
| Year | Title | Role | Notes |
|---|---|---|---|
| 1981 | Chariots of Fire | Watson | |
