= Only You (Starlight Express song) =

"Only You" is the love duet from Andrew Lloyd Webber's Starlight Express. It is performed by the protagonist, Rusty, a young steam locomotive and his true love, the observation car, Pearl.

== Overview ==
"Only You" is the second version of the show-stopping love song at the key moment in Starlight Express. In the Original London production, Pearl sang a solo "Only He", a passionate power ballad originally performed by Stephanie Lawrence. At the end of this solo Rusty came to find Pearl, and together they sang a very short reprise of the song, "Only You". "Only He" proved to be a highly demanding song, coming shortly after the performers have raced at up to 30 mph on roller skates, and it was found this song in this context was too demanding for most performers to sing.

"Only You" is essentially Pearl's solo "Only He", as opposed to the reprise version in the original, re-arranged as a duet between Pearl and Rusty, with the most demanding octave leap passages removed. It replaced "Only He" in London in 1987. This simplified duet version was used in all productions from Broadway until the 1992 London re-vamp. This version is in nature sweet and reflective, less of a show-stopper but more in keeping with the character's journeys.

Only You was, in turn, replaced by "Next Time You Fall in Love", a new song written as part of the 1992 London production revamp, then used in following productions. "Next Time" is a re-working of Lloyd Webber's song "The Ballad of Billy Macaw" from Cats. Musically it is near identical, with replacement lyrics by Don Black. The lyrics of "Next Time" make very little sense within the context of the show, however at the time it was released as a chart single.

"Next time" was added to the German production in 2003, replacing "Du Allein" (direct translation of "Only You"). The German lyrics resolved the issue of lacking context, the song was titled "Allein im Licht der Sterne" (Alone, in the Starlight). At the same time the 2003 US Tour replaced "Next Time" with the second version of "Only He", a duet version that included the octave leaps from the original song, in a very rich, dramatic arrangement, aided by the use of pre-recorded instrumentation. This version has now found its way to the 2009 New Zealand tour.

In 2008 the second version of "Only He" was included in the German production, now titled "Nur Mit Ihm" (Only with Him) to distinguish from the earlier "Du Allein".

Pearl singing 'Only He' in the London Production.

=== Context ===
Rusty's journey through the story of Starlight Express shows him, in his darkest hour, calling to the Starlight Express for help. The Starlight Express answers telling him "Only You have the power within you...". Rusty gains belief in himself, and goes on to race in the final. During the race, Pearl, who is racing with Greaseball, is injured by Electra and disconnected at full speed. She is sure to crash when Rusty leaves the race to rescue her. He then goes on to win the race, but has lost Pearl. He wants to declare his love openly to her, but first he must find her. Meanwhile, Pearl, injured and alone far from the finish line, realises how she has been blind to her own love for the little Steam Train who would do anything for her. Only He actually cares for her, the other engines left her to die.

The song is used for the moment when Pearl realises that Rusty is her true love, and when Rusty reiterates for the umpteenth time his love for her.

== Music ==
The music was composed by Andrew Lloyd Webber. The key is dependent on the production;, in London it was D major (Only he was in C Major); Germany, A major, later B major; Broadway, C Major; Australia/Japan, A major; and in the UK tour B Major. It later transposes up a tone twice in all versions but London.

The tune is also used in the 'Starlight Sequence', along with the Starlight Express theme. The "Only You" theme represents discovery; of Rusty's self belief, of Pearl's love.

Underneath the tune is a very simple chord sequence. Variations on the sequence have been used within songs such as Our Last Summer by ABBA, Calling Occupants of Interplanetary Craft by Klaatu, Don't Walk Away from Xanadu and Easy Like Sunday Morning by Lionel Richie (similar to 'Poppa's Blues', which uses a traditional blues chord sequence and bassline). The sequence (in Roman Numerals) is as follows;

I – III – IV – V – I – III – IV – V – III – VI – II – IV – V – I

== Lyrics ==
The Lyrics for "Only He" and "Only You" are by Richard Stilgoe.

The commonly known opening verse of "Only He" – "look at me, a woman, calm and in control/ No silly girl whose head's always turning" is in fact from the single release version of the song, and are obviously out of context when sung by Pearl, who is exactly a silly girl whose head is turned by each attractive male that passes her. The stage production used significantly different lyrics, more appropriate to the context: "known him for a lifetime, known him not at all/ Thought there was nothing special about him". "Only You" cuts this first verse, Pearl starting at the chorus "Only You/ have the power to move me"

The second version of "Only He" has lyrics re-worked from the original. The alterations are not credited to David Yazbek, who worked on re-vamping the show for the 2003 US tour. The lyrics are predominantly Richard Stilgoe's original work altered slightly, but include lyrics such as Rusty's singing "You are my Starlight" to Pearl. Earlier on, Rusty looked for 'the Starlight Express'. For romantic purposes of this number, he suggests that Pearl is 'his Starlight', 'Starlight' being a metaphor of Rusty's motivation. Obviously he cannot mean it literally, as the Starlight Express, heard onstage a few scenes previously, was definitely not Pearl! The most glaring contextual nonsensities in the show have appeared at this point in the plot, including Don Black's "Back then was when we touched the Starlight". Rusty and Pearl have a minimal relationship at the beginning of the show, they have no significant past other than a tentative agreement to race together. And while (in the London staging) Rusty did touch the Starlight Express, Pearl was clearly not with him.

=== Spoken lines ===
This song is one of the few from Starlight Express to have spoken lines, acting as a bridge passage in the music between Rusty's first verse and the first chorus sung as a duet:

Rusty: Pearl, I had to find you. Are you okay?
Pearl: Rusty, I'm fine thanks to you. But I made you lose the race!
Rusty: No, you didn't make me lose, you made me win!
Pearl: You won?
Rusty: We won! Come on...

== Choreography and blocking ==
Choreography and blocking is, of course, entirely dependent on production and the capabilities of the set. In London, as the other characters cleared the stage to follow Poppa looking for Rusty and Pearl, a scene change was suggested by Pearl, sat on a railway buffer, pushed onstage behind them. From this perch she started singing. As the passion in the song built, she stood and skated around. In other productions without mobile set pieces, Pearl kneels to start her song. At Rusty's entrance, Pearl turns away from him, she can't immediately face him from shame at how she's hurt him. But the spoken lines give her the confidence to turn to face him, and to skate with him, before finishing with their fisted hands touching, to show that they are 'coupled'. This gesture is also used by Pearl and Dinah in the coaches dialogue in the beginning of 'Freight', as the coaches are teaming up against the Trucks. Volta and Joule also use this gesture after the final race, though sometimes they high-five. Rusty and Pearl's edition involves a hug, and sometimes a kiss, resulting in a more romantic suggestion.

== Recordings ==
=== Show-related recordings ===
==== Only You ====
- Original London Cast Recording – Stephanie Lawrence & Ray Shell (1984)
- Broadway Concept Album – Josie Aiello & Peter Hewlett (1987)
- Japan/Australia Tour Highlights Album - Nikki Belsher & Bobby Collins (1987).
- German Cast Recording (Du Allein) – Ute Lemper & Johnny Logan (1988)
- German Live Recording (Du Allein) – Lovette George & Bernie Blanks (1989)
- German Highlights Recording (Du Allein) – Claudia Bradley and Colin Munro (1991)

==== Only He ====
- Original London Cast Recording – Stephanie Lawrence (1984)
- Revised Bochum Recording – Kevin Khöler and Carla Langridge (2008)
- New Zealand Cast – Rebecca Wright and Will Martin (2009)

=== Released as a single ===
==== Only You ====
- Frances Ruffelle and Michael Crawford
- Sarah Brightman and Cliff Richard
- Ray Shell

==== Only He ====
- Stephanie Lawrence (Only He Has the Power to Move Me)

== Sheet music ==
- The sheet music for the Broadway version of 'Only You' can be found in the Broadway piano score, as sung by Josie Aiello and Peter Hewlett on the recording, and Reva Rice and Greg Mowry. This version can also be found in the newly released Andrew Lloyd Webber Duets Vocal Score.
- The Original London version of 'Only You' is in the Starlight Express section of 'The Andrew Lloyd Webber Anthology', along with 'Starlight Express', 'There's Me' and 'Make Up My Heart'.
- London's version of 'Only He' is available as a choir arrangement in the UK.
- 'Du Allein' is also available, but it is not the version from the Bochum production. It is a direct translation of the Broadway score, in a lower key.
