= Tim Driesen =

Belgian actor, notable for roles in both musicals, plays, and television serials

- Born: Antwerp, Herentals, Belgium
- Occupations: Actor, musical theatre performer, singer-songwriter, composer, dancer, pianist

Tim Driesen is a Belgian actor, notable for roles in both musicals, plays, and television serials. He has composed a full-scale musical as well as a number of pop-songs. In 2007, he created the role of Adrian Banks (a character based on pop-star Mark Owen) in the Take That musical, Never Forget. Take That member Gary Barlow, who wrote the majority of the production's musical numbers, said jokingly of the cast: "I'm just worried that they're better than us". When the musical opened, Driesen appeared with fellow cast members Dean Chisnall, Craig Els, Stephane Anelli, Eaton James and Nancy Sullivan on ITV's GMTV performing the show's title song, "Never Forget". He also appeared in the UK tour of Starlight Express. Driesen appeared in the television series, The Bubbles.

He is also noted for his voice-over work in televised commercials.

Driesen appeared as Phoebus in Notre Dame de Paris in Belgium (Antwerp & Ghent). He played a role for which he won 'Best Supporting Actor in a Musical' at the VMPs (Flemish Musical Awards).

His musical 'My Super Girlfriend' (previously known as 'Super Alice Smith') has been workshopped and showcased in conjunction with 'Perfect Pitch' at Trafalgar Studios in London

Tim has played Joey Primo in Rock of Ages in London's West End. He was alternate for lead character Drew, as well as understudying and regularly performing as Stacee Jaxx.

Tim then did Jersey Boys in the Netherlands in which he plays the lead character Frankie Valli. The cast performed at Musical Sing-A-Long on Dutch TV in September 2013.

For the past couple of years he has been performing in Disney's The Lion King, first in The Netherlands and currently on the UK tour.

== Background ==
Originally from Belgium, Driesen is based in London in the UK. He trained at Laine Theatre Arts in Epsom.

== Credits ==
=== Theatre ===
- Joey Primo U/S Stacee Jaxx, Drew* Rock of Ages (Garrick theatre)
- Young Ken Barlow in Street of Dreams (musical) UK & Ireland
- Alternate Phoebus/Gringoire in Notre-Dame de Paris (musical) Asian Tour
- Galileo in We Will Rock You (musical) (Antwerp, Belgium)
- Phoebus in Notre-Dame de Paris (musical) Antwerp & Ghent, Belgium
- Adrian Banks/Mark Owen in Never Forget (2007 UK tour and original West End run.)

Taking solos in "Pray", "Take That & Party" and "Never Forget", and also performing in numbers such as "It Only Takes a Minute", "Babe", Back for Good, "I Found Heaven" and "Relight My Fire".

- Joseph in Joseph and the Amazing Technicolor Dreamcoat
- Mark in Rent
- Nintendo, and understudy to Rusty the Steam Engine (played by actor Oliver Thornton), Caboose and Flat-Top the Brick Truck in Starlight Express (2006 UK tour.)

Tim Driesen performed in numbers such as Starlight Express, Starlight Sequence, Only He and Light at the End of the Tunnel during his run in Starlight Express.

- Father Alexander and understudy to Eddy in Mamma Mia! (West End.)
- Mephistopheles Smith in Mephistopheles Smith
- Donny Osmond and David Cassidy in Thank You for the Music
- Riff Raff and Rocky in The Rocky Horror Show
- Bat Boy: The Musical (frequently playing the title role)
- Narrator in Glory Hallelujah 2000 (Belgian Production.)
- Demetrius in A Midsummer Night's Dream
- Robot Three Six in The Lost Christmas a musical by Laurence Mark Wythe
- Jim in Jet Set Go! a musical by Jake Brunger and Pippa Cleary
- Jack in Jack and the Beanstalk (York, England, 2009)

In which Driesen sang Go the Distance From Disney's Hercules.

- Frankie Valli in the Dutch version of "Jersey Boys"

=== Television ===
- Behind the Musical: The Making of Never Forget
- The Bubbles (1991 TV series)
- This Morning
- GMTV
- Loose Women
- Idols 2004 (performed 'Breathe Easy')

=== Film/DVD ===
- Never Forget as Adrian Banks/Mark Owen (DVD)

Filmed at the opening night at Manchester Opera House. Driesen also appears in an interview on the DVD's bonus material.

=== Recordings ===
==== Albums ====
- In My Corner
- Never Forget original cast CD, singing the role of Adrian Banks/Mark Owen
- Mephistophles Smith EP
- Belgian Soldier, Castle Video's
- Glory Hallelujah 2000 revival cast CD
- The Bubbles

==== Songs ====
- "Small Town Girl" (from My Super Girlfriend)
- '"It's All Cliché" (from My Super Girlfriend)
- "My Super Girlfriend" (from My Super Girlfriend)
- "Evil Has Many Faces" (from My Super Girlfriend)
