= Starlight Express (disambiguation) =

Starlight Express is a 1984 musical by Andrew Lloyd Webber.

Starlight Express may also refer to:

- "Starlight Express" (song), a song from the musical
- The Starlight Express, a 1915 play by Violet Pearn and Algernon Blackwood with music by Edward Elgar
- Starlight Express (bus), an intercity bus service that ceased operations in 2018.
