= Gavin Lee =

English actor

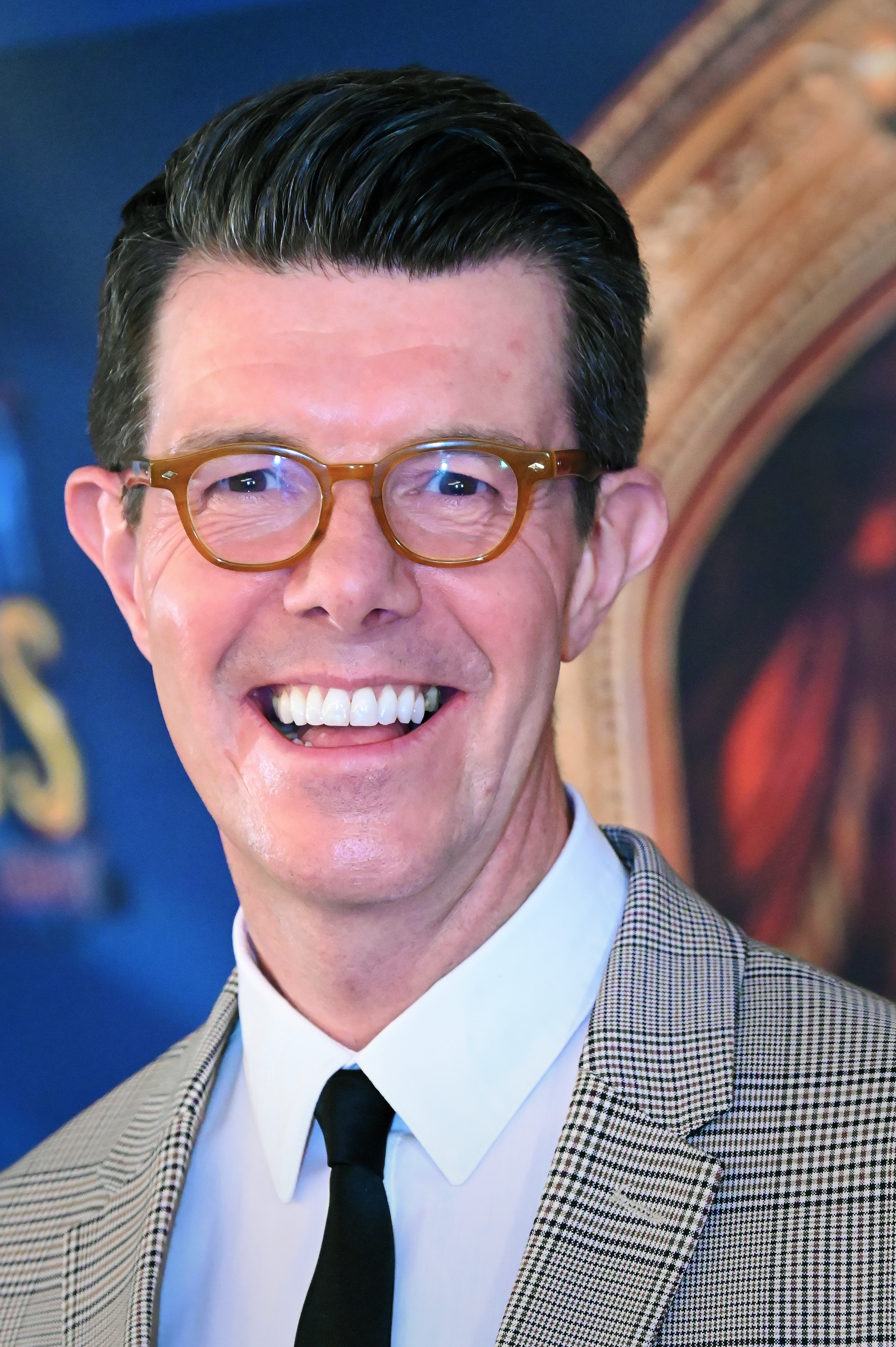
- Lee in 2025
- Born: Woodbridge, Suffolk, England
- Occupations: Actor; singer; dancer
- Years active: 1990–present

Gavin Lee is an English actor. Known for his work in musical theatre in the West End and on Broadway, he portrayed Bert in Mary Poppins, and originated the role of Squidward Tentacles in SpongeBob SquarePants: The Musical.

== Life and career ==
=== Early years and education ===
Lee is an alumnus of the Doreen Bird College of Performing Arts after which he has been involved in various musicals as a performer and choreographer.

=== Career ===
Lee appeared in the dance play Contact in the West End at the Queen's Theatre, opening in October 2002.

In 2004, Lee auditioned to be the Bert understudy in the London production of Mary Poppins, but won the role outright. He originated the role of Bert in the original West End production. He also starred as Bert in the Broadway production of Mary Poppins. He was chosen for the Broadway role because of his critically acclaimed performance as Bert in the West End production. He departed the Broadway production after nearly two years to launch the US National Tour, but returned to the Broadway production in August 2010 until January 2013. Lee was nominated for Best Performance by an Actor in a Musical at the 2005 Olivier Awards and the 2005 Theatregoer's Choice Awards for originating the West End role of Bert. For his Broadway performance, Lee was nominated for the 2006 Outer Critics Circle Awards (Outstanding Actor in a Musical) and the 2007 Tony Award for Best Leading Actor in a Musical. He also won the 2007 Drama Desk Award for Featured Actor in a Musical and an award for Outstanding Broadway Debut at the 63rd annual Theatre World Awards. In August 2007, Lee was added to Sardi's caricature gallery with other Broadway actors.

In June 2008, Lee performed in a concert version of Show Boat at Carnegie Hall as Frank Schultz. He has performed as part of Andrew Lloyd Webber's The Phantom of the Opera film adaptation, appearing as one of the singers/dancers in the "Masquerade" scene.

Lee and former London co-star Laura Michelle Kelly performed as Bert and Mary Poppins in the America Celebrates 4 July at Fords Theatre in front of President Barack Obama and First Lady Michelle Obama on 6 June 2010. The special aired on 2 July 2010 on ABC. Lee again reunited with Kelly when he returned to the role of Bert in the Broadway production of Mary Poppins on 24 August 2010.

He took over the role of Jerry Travers in the West End production of Top Hat beginning 5 February 2013. He joined the Broadway revival of Les Miserables as Thenardier beginning 3 March 2015.

Lee played Squidward Tentacles in SpongeBob SquarePants, the Broadway Musical. The stage musical premiered at the Oriental Theatre in Chicago, Illinois, and ran from June to July 2016. Lee reprised his role as Squidward for the Broadway run of the musical, starting with November 2017 previews at the Palace Theatre and remaining until it closed in September 2018. Lee was nominated for a Tony Award for Best Featured Actor in a Musical for his role as Squidward.

In June 2019, he appeared at Paper Mill Playhouse in Millburn, New Jersey, taking on the role of Lumiere in Beauty and the Beast. He reprised the role in the 2021 UK tour. The production then transferred to the West End's London Palladium for a limited engagement beginning June 2022.

On 17 February 2020, he performed the Manhattan Concert Productions' 50th-anniversary celebration of Joseph and the Amazing Technicolor Dreamcoat at David Geffen Hall, Lincoln Center. He played the Butler.

Lee returned to the Paper Mill Playhouse to play Max Detweiler in its production of The Sound of Music from 2 December – 1 January 2023. He then went on to star in the tribute revue Stephen Sondheim's Old Friends, which opened at the Gielgud Theatre on 3 October 2023 following preview performances that began on 21 September. The production ran until 6 January 2024. In 2025, the revue transferred to the Ahmanson Theatre in Los Angeles and then to Broadway's Samuel J. Friedman Theatre. Lee took over the role of Scar in the Broadway production of The Lion King beginning 22 July 2025.

== Acting credits ==
=== Theatre ===
Year	Show	Role	Venue	Notes
2025-present	The Lion King	Scar	Minskoff Theatre	Broadway replacement
2025	Stephen Sondheim's Old Friends	Himself/Various	Samuel J. Friedman Theatre	Broadway production; originated role
2025	Stephen Sondheim's Old Friends	Himself/Various	Ahmanson Theatre	
2024-2025	Les Misérables	Monsieur Thénardier	-	Arena Spectacular World Tour
2023-2024	Stephen Sondheim's Old Friends	Himself/Various	Gielgud Theatre	West End
2023	Oliver!	Fagin	New York City Center	Encores!; Standby but went on several performances during the 11-day run
2022	The Sound of Music	Max Detweiler	Paper Mill Playhouse	
2021-2022	Beauty and the Beast	Lumière	UK Tour & London Palladium	Reprising his role from the 2019 Paper Mill Playhouse production
2020	Joseph and the Amazing Technicolor Dreamcoat	Butler	David Geffen Hall	
2019	Mr. Magoo's Christmas Carol	Mr. Magoo/Scrooge	Gerald W. Lynch Theater	
2019	Beauty and the Beast	Lumière	Paper Mill Playhouse	
2018	Dr. Seuss' How the Grinch Stole Christmas! The Musical	The Grinch	US National Tour	In Chicago, Boston, and New York
2017	SpongeBob SquarePants: The Musical	Squidward Tentacles	Palace Theatre	Broadway production; originated role
2016	SpongeBob SquarePants: The Musical	Squidward Tentacles	Oriental Theatre	Originated role
2015-2016	Les Misérables	Monsieur Thénardier	Imperial Theatre	Broadway Replacement
2014	Holiday Inn	Ted Hanover	Goodspeed Opera House	Replacement
2013	Top Hat	Jerry Travers	Aldwych Theatre	Replacement
2010–2013	Mary Poppins	Bert	New Amsterdam Theatre	Return to role
2009–2010	Mary Poppins	Bert	US National Tour	Originated role
2008	Show Boat	Frank Schultz	Carnegie Hall	
2006–2008	Mary Poppins	Bert	New Amsterdam Theatre	Broadway production; originated role
2004–2006	Mary Poppins	Bert	Bristol Hippodrome & Prince Edward Theatre	West End production; originated role
2002	Contact	Aristocrat	Queen's Theatre	West End
2002	Let's Kick Arts	Ensemble	Bridewell Theatre	
2002	Aladdin	Wishee Washee	Devonshire Park Theatre	
2001	Zip Goes a Million	Percy Piggott	The Theatre Museum	
2001	DuBarry Was a Lady	Harry/Captain of the Guard	Her Majesty's Theatre	West End
2001	Peggy Sue Got Married	Richard	Shaftesbury Theatre	West End; Originated role
2000	Whenever	Oscar	Stephen Joseph Theatre	
1999	A Saint She Ain't	Danny O'Reilly	Apollo Theatre & King's Head Theatre	West End; Originated role
1999	Of Thee I Sing	J.P. Wintergeen	Bridewell Theatre	
1999	Jubilee	Prince James	Her Majesty's Theatre	West End; Also choreographer
1998-1999	Oklahoma!	Slim	National Theatre & Lyceum Theatre	West End; Originated role
1998	Singin' in the Rain	Don Lockwood	Haymarket Theatre	
1998	Snoopy	Linus	Watermill Theatre	
1997	Saturday Night	Male Vocalist	Bridewell Theatre	Originated role
1997	Crazy for You	Bobby Child	National Tour	
1993	Crazy for You	Swing	Prince Edward Theatre	
1996	Immaculate Deception	Rosenburg	Wimbledon Studio Theatre	
1984	Flower Drum Song	Wang San	Wolsey Theatre	
1983	Bugsy Malone	Seymore Scoop	Her Majesty's Theatre	West End debut

=== Cast recordings ===
- Mary Poppins
- A Saint She Ain't
- Zip Goes a Million
- Saturday Night
- SpongeBob SquarePants (musical)

=== Film ===
- Beyond the Sea
- The Phantom of the Opera

=== Television ===
- White Collar – Alan Woodford (5 episodes)
- The Good Wife – Jake Alister (Season 2, Episode 18 "Killer Song", 2011)
- Law & Order: Special Victims Unit – Dennis Griscomb (2 episodes)
- The SpongeBob Musical: Live on Stage! – Squidward Tentacles (reprising his role from the Broadway musical)
- Little America – Henry (Season 1, Episode 4)

== Awards and nominations ==
=== Tony Awards ===
Note: The year given is the year of the ceremony

Year	Award	Performance	Result
2007	Best Actor in a Musical	Mary Poppins	Nominated
2018	Best Featured Actor in a Musical	SpongeBob SquarePants	Nominated

=== Drama Desk Awards ===
Note: The year given is the year of the ceremony

Year	Award	Performance	Result
2007	Outstanding Featured Actor in a Musical	Mary Poppins	Won
2018	Outstanding Featured Actor in a Musical	SpongeBob SquarePants	Won

=== Laurence Olivier Awards ===
Note: The year given is the year of the ceremony

Year	Award	Performance	Result
2005	Best Actor in a Musical	Mary Poppins	Nominated

== See also ==
- List of British actors
