= Orvin (disambiguation) =

Orvin may refer to:

== Places ==
- Orvin, municipality in the canton of Bern in Switzerland
- Orvin Mountains, major group of mountain ranges in Queen Maud Land

== Given name ==
- Orvin B. Fjare (1918–2011), U.S. Representative from Montana
- Orvin Cabrera (1977–2010), Honduran footballer

== Surname ==
- Anders K. Orvin (1889–1980), Norwegian geologist and explorer

== Other ==
- Orvin – Champion Of Champions, 2003 musical play by British playwright Alan Ayckbourn, with music by Denis King
