= The Musical of Musicals (The Musical!) =

Musical by Joanne Bogart and Eric Rockwell

- (The Musical!)
- Logo
- Music: Eric Rockwell
- Lyrics: Joanne Bogart
- Book: Joanne Bogart; Eric Rockwell
- Productions: 2003 off-Broadway; 2005 off-Broadway; 2006 London

The Musical of Musicals (The Musical!) is a musical by Joanne Bogart and Eric Rockwell. It has five acts, each of which is a short musical parodying (and paying homage to) the style of an American or British musical theater composer or composer/lyricist team, all dealing with roughly the same classic melodrama plot: "I can't pay the rent!"

The musical premiered off-Broadway in 2003 at the York Theatre. It again played off-Broadway in 2005 at the Dodger Stages V with the same cast. It also had a production on London's West End, in Australia (Canberra - 2009 and February 2010) as well as numerous productions in U.S. regional theaters and in Canada.

== Roles ==
Each musical features four players who reprise similar archetypal melodramatic roles in each.

- The villain, "Jitter" - Male, the landlord figure of each musical who demands the rent be paid or another form of recompense offered.
- The hero, "Billy" - Male, the leading man and romantic interest who, in the end, valiantly offers to pay the rent, whether he can or not.
- The ingenue, "June" - Female, the leading lady who cannot pay her rent.
- The matron, "Abby" - Female, the older woman to whom June turns for advice, always with the words "Thank you Abby, that was so helpful."

== Plot synopses ==
=== Corn! ===
Corn! is set in the style of the musicals of Rodgers & Hammerstein, featuring parodies of and references to Oklahoma!, Carousel, The Sound of Music, The King and I, Cinderella, Flower Drum Song and South Pacific. In Kansas in August, Jidder threatens that June will have to marry him if she can't pay the rent; Big Willy is torn between his desire to marry her himself and his desire for the freedom of his carnival-barker lifestyle, and Mother Abby advises her to "follow her dream", leading to a lengthy dream ballet and a happy ending.

=== A Little Complex ===
A Little Complex is based upon the musicals of Stephen Sondheim (Into the Woods, Company, Sweeney Todd: The Demon Barber of Fleet Street, A Little Night Music and Sunday in the Park with George, et al.). In a New York apartment complex full of neurotics, Jitter is a mad artist/landlord who plots to murder his tenants, including bird-obsessed, indecisive Jeune, deep-thinking composer Billy and pessimistic alcoholic Abby, for throwing his artwork out with the trash. After many overly-complex lyrics and dissonant music, he does.

=== Dear Abby ===
Dear Abby parodies the work of Jerry Herman, especially Mame, Hello, Dolly!, La Cage aux Folles and Dear World. Aunt Abby is an unconventional Manhattan socialite who is adored by her neighbors and whose advice solves everyone's problems. Between costume changes, Abby manages to match her nephew William and her geeky friend Juney-Fae and convince the stuffy landlord Mr. Jitters to embrace his true self and become a drag queen. Much dancing follows.

=== Aspects of Junita ===
Aspects of Junita plays upon the work of Andrew Lloyd Webber, including The Phantom of the Opera, Evita, Jesus Christ Superstar, Sunset Boulevard, Cats, Joseph and the Amazing Technicolor Dreamcoat and Starlight Express. In this sung-through pop opera, Junita hopes that becoming a superstar, despite her lack of talent, will allow her to get out of paying her rent from the mysterious Sir Phantom Jitter. As her boyfriend Bill bemoans the lack of communication in their relationship (due to the fact that they literally cannot talk), and fading diva Abigail von Starr advises her to go over the top, Junita falls under Phantom Jitter's spell, only for an errant chandelier to bring things literally crashing to a spectacular climax.

=== Speakeasy ===
Speakeasy reflects the work of John Kander and Fred Ebb, chiefly Chicago, Cabaret, Kiss of the Spider Woman and Liza with a Z. In a speakeasy in 1930s Chicago, where half the characters are German, Fräulein Abby advises Juny to turn to prostitution to pay her rent; her boyfriend, Villy, is both gay and in jail, and is of no help; and the activity is presided over by the creepy emcee/landlord Jütter. All sing about how depressing life is and dance around in skimpy clothing.

After the end of Speakeasy, the cast concludes the show by singing "Done", a parody of the song "One" from the musical A Chorus Line.

== Songs ==
Act 1

- "Prologue"
- "Introduction / Melodrame" – Company

=== Corn ===
- "Oh, What Beautiful Corn" – Big Willy — parody of "Oh, What a Beautiful Mornin'" from Oklahoma! and "I'm in Love with a Wonderful Guy" from South Pacific
- "Scene" – Mother Abby, Big Willy and June
- "I Couldn't Keer Less About You" – June — parody of "People Will Say We're In Love" from Oklahoma!
- "I Don't Love You" – Big Willy — parody of "If I Loved You" from Carousel
- "Scene" – June, Jidder and Big Willy
- "Follow Your Dream" – Mother Abby — parody of "You'll Never Walk Alone" from Carousel and "Climb Ev'ry Mountain" from The Sound of Music
- "Dream Ballet" – Company — in the style of Oklahoma! and Flower Drum Song
- "Sowillyquey" – Big Willy — parody of "Soliloquy" from Carousel
- "Clam Dip" – Chorus — parody of "That Was a Real Nice Clam Bake" from Carousel
- "Scene" - Big Willy, June, Jidder and Mother Abby
- "Daylight Savings Time" – Chorus — parody of "Oklahoma" from Oklahoma!
- "Corn Finale" – Company — in the style of South Pacific and Carousel

=== A Little Complex ===
- "Welcome to the Woods" – Chorus — in the style of Sunday in the Park with George, A Little Night Music and Into the Woods
- "The Ballad of Jitter" – Chorus — parody of "The Ballad of Sweeney Todd" from Sweeney Todd: The Demon Barber of Fleet Street
- "Jitter's Oath" – Jitter — in the style of Sweeney Todd: The Demon Barber of Fleet Street and Sunday in the Park with George
- "Scene" – Jeune and Jitter
- "Birds" – Jeune — parody of "Green Finch and Linnet Bird" from "Sweeney Todd", and the style of Into the Woods
- "Getting Away With Murder" – Jitter — in the style of Assassins and Sweeney Todd: The Demon Barber of Fleet Street
- "Billy-Baby / A Melody?" – Jeune, Billy — parody of "Company" from Company
- "Stay with Me" – Jitter, Jeune, Billy — parody of "Stay with Me" from Into the Woods
- "Jeune's Patter" – Jeune — parody of "Getting Married Today" from Company
- "We're All Gonna Die" – Abby — parody of "The Ladies Who Lunch" from Company and in the style of Assassins
- "Complex Finale" – Chorus — in the style of Sweeney Todd: The Demon Barber of Fleet Street

=== Dear Abby ===
- "Dear Abby" – Chorus — parody of "Hello, Dolly!" from Hello, Dolly!
- "Take My Advice and Live" – Aunt Abby, Chorus — in the style of Mame
- "Scene" – Junie Faye, Aunt Abby and William
- "Show Tune" – William, Junie Faye — in the style of Mack and Mabel
- "Scene" – Aunt Abby, Mr. Jitters and Junie Faye
- "Did I Put Out Enough?" – Aunt Abby — in the style of Mame
- "Dear Abby Finale" – Chorus — in the style of Hello, Dolly!

Act 2

=== Aspects of Junita ===
- "Aspects of Junita / Prologue" – Bill, Chorus — in the style of Evita
- "I've Heard That Song Before" – Junita — parody of "Take That Look Off Your Face" from Tell Me on a Sunday
- "Opera Scena" – Bill, Phantom Jitter and Junita
- "Sing A Song" – Phantom Jitter — parody of "The Music of the Night" from The Phantom of the Opera
- "Junita's Recitative" – Junita — in the style of Evita
- "Go Go Go Go Junita" – Chorus — parody of "Go Go GO Joseph" from Joseph and the Amazing Technicolor Dreamcoat, and the styles of Starlight Express and Cats
- "We Never Talk Anymore" – Bill, Junita — parody of "Another Suitcase in Another Hall" from Evita and "I Don't Know How to Love Him" from Jesus Christ Superstar
- "A Sense of Entitlement / Second Opera Scena" – Chorus, Junita — in the style of Evita
- "Over the Top" – Abigail Von Schtarr — parody of "Memory" from Cats and "As If We Never Said Goodbye" from Sunset Boulevard
- "Chandelier Scena" – Bill, Junita, Phantom Jitter — in the style of The Phantom of the Opera
- "Aspects Finale" – Company — parody of "Don't Cry for Me Argentina" from Evita and in the style of Jesus Christ Superstar

=== Speakeasy ===
- "Hola, Aloha, Hello" – Jütter — parody of "Willkommen" from Cabaret
- "Juny With a "J"" – Juny — parody of "Say Liza (Liza with a "Z")" from Liza with a Z
- "Color Me Gay" – Villy — parody of "My Coloring Book" recorded by Barbra Streisand written by Kander and Ebb
- "Just Don't Pay" – Chorus — parody of "Cell Block Tango" from Chicago
- "Easy Mark" – Fraulein Abby — in the style of Cabaret
- "Round and Round" – Juny, Chorus — in the style of Chicago

=== Epilogue ===
- "Done" – Company — parody of "One" from A Chorus Line

== Production history ==
The musical premiered off-Broadway on December 16, 2003, at the York Theatre Company at St. Peter's and ran through October 2, 2004, for 194 performances and 14 previews. (It closed on January 25, 2004 and re-opened on May 24, 2004.) The production was directed and choreographed by Pamela Hunt and featured Joanne Bogart, Craig Fols, Lovette George, and Eric Rockwell. The production was nominated for the Lucille Lortel Award for Outstanding Musical and the Drama Desk Award for Outstanding Musical, Outstanding Featured Actress in a Musical (George), Outstanding Director of a Musical (Hunt), and Outstanding Lyrics (Bogart) and Outstanding Music (Rockwell).

The musical re-opened off-Broadway on February 10, 2005, at the New World Stages V (Dodger Stages) and ran through November 13, 2005. The same director and cast were in the production. The soundtrack was released by Jay Records two years later.

The musical has been performed in regional theater in the United States, in Canberra (Australia - 2009 and February 2010), in Canada, and on London's West End. The London production ran from March 31, 2006, through April 22, 2006, at the Sound Theatre. The musical was also produced by Theatre New Brunswick (TNB), based in Fredericton, New Brunswick, Canada. The TNB production was directed by Caleb Marshall, with choreography by Nicola Pantin and musical direction by Michael Doherty. The TNB production was performed on March 15–17, 2012, in Fredericton and on March 18, 2012, in Moncton.

A virtual production was presented on April 18, 2021, as part of an effort to raise funds to repair the York Theater following a water main break. The original director, Pamela Hunt, returned as an artistic supervisor.
