= P. J. Benjamin =

American actor

- Born: September 2, 1951 (age 73); Chicago, Illinois, U.S.
- Occupation: Actor
- Years active: 1973–present
- Known for: Playing the Wizard in Wicked and Amos in Chicago
- Spouse: Louisa Flaningam

P. J. Benjamin (born September 2, 1951) is an American actor known for his work in theatre.

== Career ==
A native of Chicago, Illinois, Benjamin made his Broadway debut in the 1973 revival of The Pajama Game. He has since performed in at least seven other Broadway shows as well as various touring, off-Broadway, and regional productions.

Benjamin is best known for his performances as Amos Hart in Chicago and the Wizard of Oz in Wicked. Between 1997 and 2006, he played Amos in the Broadway production and two national tours of Chicago. The musical shared on its official Facebook page that Benjamin had performed as Amos on Broadway for 1,989 days, which was "more than any other actor for any other character" in the production as of November 2011. He joined Wicked's first North American tour as the Wizard in 2006. He played the Wizard on Broadway from 2008 to 2011, performed in the tour in 2012, and returned to the Broadway production in 2015 and again in 2017.

Outside his work in theatre, Benjamin has appeared in films and television series, including Ice Age, Law & Order, and Law & Order: Special Victims Unit.

== Personal life ==
He is married to actress Louisa Flaningam.

== Theatre credits ==
Year	Show	Role	Venue	Ref.
1973	The Pajama Game	Dancer	Broadway	
1979	Saravá	Vadinho	Broadway	
1980	Charlie and Algernon	Charlie	Broadway	
1981	Sophisticated Ladies	Performer	Broadway	
1985	Wind in the Willows	Chief Weasel	Broadway	
1992	Chess	Walter	Paper Mill Playhouse	
1993	Ain't Broadway Grand	Mike Todd (standby)	Broadway	
1993	Promises, Promises	J. D. Sheldrake	Goodspeed Opera House	
1995	Brigadoon	Jeff	Paper Mill Playhouse	
1997	Houdini	Martin Beck	Goodspeed Opera House	
1997–2000	Chicago	Amos Hart	National tour	
2002	A Saint She Ain't	W. C. Fields	Westport Country Playhouse	
2003–2005	Chicago	Amos Hart	Broadway	
2005	Chicago	Amos Hart	National tour	
2006	Wicked	The Wizard of Oz	First North American tour	
2008	Damn Yankees	Joe Boyd	Encores! Summer Stars	
2008–2011	Wicked	The Wizard of Oz	Broadway	
2012	Wicked	The Wizard of Oz	First North American tour	
2013	I Forgive You, Ronald Reagan	Ray	Off-Broadway	
2015	Wicked	The Wizard of Oz	Broadway	
2015	Moonshine: That Hee Haw Musical	Grandpa	Dallas Theater Center	
2016	The Wizard of Oz	Professor Marvel/The Wizard	The Muny	
2017	Wicked	The Wizard of Oz	Broadway	
2022	Choir Boy	Mr. Pendleton	Philadelphia Theatre Company	
