= Lovette George =

American actress

- Born: 9 December 1961; Yonkers, New York, U.S.
- Died: 6 September 2006 (aged 44); New York City, New York, U.S.
- Occupation: Actress
- Years active: 1986–2006

Lovette Carol George (December 9, 1961 – September 6, 2006) was an American actress and singer. Primarily active in musical theatre, she performed in the Broadway productions of Uptown... It's Hot! (1986), Carousel (1994 revival), and Marie Christine (1999). She is featured on the cast albums of the latter two productions. She starred in several Off-Broadway musicals, including The Musical of Musicals (The Musical!) (2003) for which she was nominated for the 2004 Drama Desk Award for Outstanding Featured Actress in a Musical. She is also heard on the cast album of this show.

On the international stage, George portrayed the role of Pearl in the German cast of Andrew Lloyd Webber's Starlight Express. The German production was a hit and is still running as of 2025. She recorded the part of Pearl for the German cast album in 1989. In addition to her work on the stage, she performed periodically in American television and film. She died of cancer in 2006 at the age of 44.

== Early life and career ==
The daughter of Richard George and Carol Joy George, Lovette George was born in Yonkers, New York on December 9, 1961. She had two sister, Richelle and Carina Marie George. Her inspiration to become a performer was partially inspired by her mother who had a career as primarily a concert singer. Her mother was trained as a classical soprano at the Juilliard School, and performed at New York City Center in productions of Carmen Jones (1956) and Porgy and Bess (1964). Her mother gave a recital at Alice Tully Hall in 1981.

In 1979 George graduated from Lincoln High School in her native city. She was trained as an actress at State University of New York at Binghamton (SUNYB) where she earned a bachelor's degree in theatre. In the final semester of her senior year she starred in SUNYB's Spring 1983 production of Loften Mitchell's Tell Pharaoh.

In 1982, while still a college student, George made her professional debut at the Cider Mill Playhouse in the musical revue Ain't Misbehavin' which was directed by Trudy Cobb Dennard and featured the music of Fats Waller. She subsequently returned to Cider Mill as Aldonza in Man of La Mancha (1983). She performed with the Actors Conservatory Theatre as Anita in West Side Story (1983), and appeared at several dinner theatre venues in New Jersey and New York state as Velma Kelly in Spotlight Productions staging of Chicago in 1984.

== Broadway debut and Starlight Express ==
George was cast in Maurice Hines's new musical revue Uptown…It's Hot which had its premiere at the Forrest Theatre in Philadelphia on December 18, 1985. She remained with the production when it transferred to Broadway's Lunt-Fontanne Theatre the following month. In the autumn of 1986 she performed the part of Ronnette in Syracuse Stage's production of Little Shop of Horrors. She later repeated that role at the Actors Theatre of Louisville (1987). In 1987 she portrayed Deena in Dreamgirls at An Evening Dinner Theater (now the Westchester Broadway Theater) in Elmsford, New York. The New York Times review described her as "a spitfire, making up in theatrical urgency what she lacks in plausible glamour." Tarrytown Daily News stated, "Lovette George gives Deena the kittenish appeal of Diana Ross and makes an astonishing transformation from sweet schoolgirl to practical professional to tough-minded star."

George performed the role of Pearl in the German cast of Andrew Lloyd Webber's Starlight Express in 1989-1990. The Starlight Express Theater in Bochum was specifically built for this production which premiered in 1988. She can be heard singing the part of Pearl on the 1989 German cast album of the musical. As of 2025 the Bochum production of Starlight Express is still running; marking 37 years of continuous performances.

== Later career ==
In 1991 George performed in the Pennsylvania Stage Company's production of Ain't Misbehavin' which was directed by Mercedes Ellington; the daughter of Duke Ellington. In 1992 she performed at the Union Square Theatre as Inez in the Off-Broadway musical Eating Raoul. In 1993 she performed once again in Dreamgirls, this time in the part of Lorrell, at the North Carolina Theatre. That same year she starred in the Kander and Ebb musical revue And the World Goes 'Round at the Studio Arena Theater. In 1994 she returned to Broadway as Penny Sinclair and one of the Snow children in the acclaimed Lincoln Center production of Carousel. She also was the understudy for Carrie in this production and performed the part when Audra McDonald was not in the role.

In September 1996 George portrayed Cleo in The Most Happy Fella at The Repertory Theatre of St. Louis for the opening of that theatre's 30th season. She remained with the production when it traveled to the Cincinnati Playhouse in the Park the following month. In 1997 she originated the role of Ruby in Rusty Magee's musical The Green Heart which premiered Off-Broadway at the Variety Arts Theatre in a production mounted by the Manhattan Theatre Club. That same year she portrayed Yum Yum in the Hot Mikado, a revised version of Gilbert and Sullivan's 1885 comic opera The Mikado, at the Alliance Theatre in Atlanta.

In 1998 George portrayed Glory Dupree in the premiere of Keb' Mo' and Keith Glover's musical Thunder Knocking at the Door at the Guthrie Theater in Minneapolis. That same year she was Kristin Chenoweth's understudy for the part of Nancy D/The Waitress in James Lapine's off-Broadway musical A New Brain. In 1999 she returned to Broadway as Celeste in Michael John LaChiusa's Marie Christine. That same year she performed in the workshop of the musical Seussical during its developmental period in Toronto. In 2002 she starred as Trudy McCloy in the United States premiere of Denis King's A Saint She Ain't at the Berkshire Theatre Festival; a work in which she also did an impersonation of Betty Garrett.

In 2003-2004 George starred in the York Theatre's Off-Broadway musical revue The Musical of Musicals (The Musical!) in which she spoofed a variety of musical theatre styles; including those of Stephen Sondheim, Kander and Ebb, Jerry Herman, Rodgers and Hammerstein and Andrew Lloyd Webber. To reflect the shift in musical parody her character of June goes through several transitions and name changes (June/Jeune/Junie Faye/Junita/Juny). For her performance she was nominated for the 2004 Drama Desk Award for Outstanding Featured Actress in a Musical. She remained with the production for its later run at Dodger Stages in 2005, and is featured on the show's cast album.

George's film credits included minor parts in Broadway Damage (1997) and Center Stage (2000). On television she made guest appearances on Another World, Sex and the City, and Hope & Faith.

== Death ==
George died on September 6, 2006, from ovarian cancer, aged 44.
