= Maria Jane Hyde =

British actor and singer

Maria Jane Hyde (born 1969) is an English singer and musical actress.

== Early life ==
Hyde was born in 1969 in The Memorial Hospital in Shooters Hill, London, England. Her father, Edward Hyde, is a successful company founder (Copyforce), her mother is Maureen (née Fennelly). Hyde grew up with her two older brothers in various Boroughs of The City of London.

From the age of four, Hyde attended the Roman Catholic Saint Mary's Primary School. At age 10, she started her training at the Italia Conti Academy of Theatre Arts, Britain's oldest theatre school.

During her training, Hyde appeared in various musicals and productions, i.e. Annie (London/ England) as 'Pepper', in The Wizard of Oz (London/ England) as 'Munchkin/Dorothy' and the BBC Television production Grange Hill.

== Career ==
In 1985, Hyde auditioned for a new type of musical at that time, the London production of Starlight Express. She was chosen by Sir Andrew Lloyd Webber and became first cast 'Pearl' in the following year, at the age of only 16.

In 1988, Hyde became the original 'Pearl' in Starlight Express Germany, the most successful musical in history.

In 2009, Maria Jane Hyde set up her own musical school - Starlight Musical Academy in Velbert, Germany.

== Personal life ==
Hyde has a daughter. She currently lives in Velbert, Germany.

== Engagements ==
=== Musical ===
- Annie (London, Victoria Palace), as Pepper
- Wizard of Oz (London, Ashcroft Theatre), as Munchkin/ Dorothy
- Cindarella (London, AdHoc Theatre Co.)
- 1985–1988: Starlight Express (London/ England), 1st Cast Pearl
- 1988–1997: Starlight Express (Bochum/ Germany), original Pearl
- 2000–2001: Tabaluga & Lilli (Oberhausen/ Germany), alternate Lilli, 2nd Cast Spinnenfrau
- 2002–2004: Miami Nights (Düsseldorf/ Germany), original Präsidentin, 2nd Cast Laura/ Mercedes

=== Tours ===
- Stella Entertainment, Asia-Tour, Soloist
- Welcome 2000, Europe-Tour, as Liza Minnelli
- Musical Nights (SET Musical Prod.), Germany-Tour, Soloist
- Musical Hautnah (Creativ Team Int.), Germany-Tour, Soloist
- Musicals in Concert (Rainbow Show Service), Germany-Tour, Over The Rainbow I, Soloist
- Musicals in Concert (Rainbow Show Service), Germany-Tour, Over The Rainbow II, Soloist

=== Other ===
- The Royal Variety Show (London, Palladium)
- BBC (London/ England), Grange Hill
- BBC (London/ England), The Ovaltineys
- diverse i.e. for: Opel GMC, Deutsche Bahn AG, Daimler-Chrysler, E-Plus, Vodafone-D2, Fijitsu-Siemens, Reemtsma, BMW, Michelin, Sparda-Bank, TNT, Sparkasse, Ferrari, Deutsche Post AG, Karstadt, Ideal Home Show

== Recordings ==
- CD, "What are you waiting for", Maria Jane Hyde, 1991
- CD Starlight Express, Pearl, Original German Cast Recording
- CD, Kindle Park, Soloist, Kids Rock CD, Los Angeles.
- CD, The Medleys, Soloist, Creativ Team Int.
- CD, Big Brother Christmas, Session Singer, Sony/BMG
- CD, Miami Nights, Baila Me, Soloist, Original Cast Recording
- CD, United Music Nation, Soloist, Jabba Records

== Gallery ==
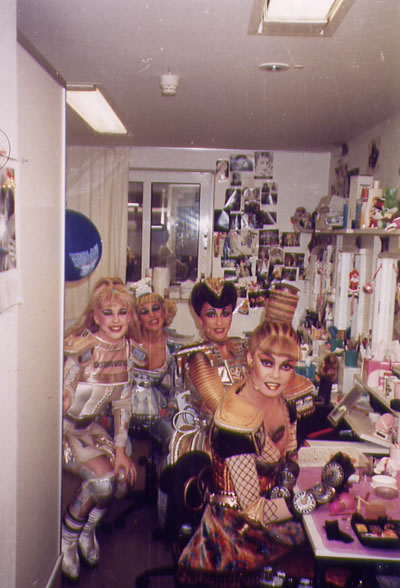
Dressing room Bochum/ Germany
