= Awaking Beauty =

- Written by: Alan Ayckbourn; Denis King
- Characters: Carabosse; The Prince; Princess Aurora; The Pigcutter
- Original language: English
- Subject: Adult parody of fairy tale
- Genre: Musical/comedy

Premiere
- Date premiered: 16 December 2008
- Place premiered: Stephen Joseph Theatre, Scarborough
- Official website

Awaking Beauty is a 2008 musical with words by Alan Ayckbourn and music by Denis King. It was shown as the Stephen Joseph Theatre's Christmas production, but, unlike earlier productions, was expressly billed as not suitable for young children. The musical is a parody sequel to Sleeping Beauty, where the wicked witch Carabosse also falls in love with the prince, and uses her own dark magic and dirty tricks to try to make him her own.
