= Light at the End of the Tunnel (musical number) =

Song
- Composer: Andrew Lloyd Webber
- Lyricist: Richard Stilgoe

Light at the End of the Tunnel is the gospel-style finale number from the musical Starlight Express. The company (all railway locomotives and cars) perform the number as a glorification to Steam. The solo lines are taken by Poppa, an old Steam Locomotive, (and Belle the Sleeping Car before she was cut).

== Music ==
The music, by Andrew Lloyd Webber, has a gospel feel and starts off in G major.

== Lyrics ==
The lyrics, by Richard Stilgoe, involve many clever plays on words related to the subject of Railway Travel.

There's a Light at the End of the Tunnel
There's a Light at the End of the Tunnel
The inside might be as black as the night
But at the end of the tunnel, there's a light

The title is an old saying, one of many inspired by the railway. Other's include 'On the Right Track' and 'Full Steam Ahead'.

=== Reference to James Watt ===
The lyrics include a verse and a chorus which pay respect the father of steam, James Watt.

'It's the power of James Watt, the steaming Scot
'The man who watched the pot and said, "Hey, I've got
'A brilliant plot, when that steam is hot
'It seems to make a lot of power"

and later;

'Thanks James Watt (Thank you Mr. Watt)
'For watching that pot

== Alternate Versions ==
=== Ein Licht ganz am Ende des Tunnels ===
The German version. The title translates as 'A Light at the very end of the Tunnel'.

=== The Megamix ===
The Megamix was added into the London re-write in 1992, and was added to the German production in 2003. It is an assortment of verses from 'Light at the End of the Tunnel' with lines/verses from other popular songs added in between.

== Deletion of Belle ==
As the original material was written for two characters as a company to sing, it had to be altered dramatically when one of those characters was deleted. When Belle was cut, several different productions dealt with the loss differently. The London show had Poppa sing the lines she sang in addition to his, and the company took the lines she sang in conversation. In early Bochum, the coaches took all of Belle's lines, and the revised version likened to the London re-write.

== Recordings ==
- Lon Satton, P.P. Arnold and Company
- Lon Satton and Company
- Richie Havens and Company
- Carl Wayne, Fiona Hendley, Jess Conrad, Paul Jones and Stephanie Lawrence
- Ray Shell
- Crimson Ensemble
- Carl Wayne
- The Sound of Musical Orchestra

=== Ein Licht ganz am Ende des Tunnels ===
- Trevor Michael Georges and Company
- David Michael Johnson and Company

=== Megamix ===
- Lon Satton and Company
- Lothair Eaton and Company
