= Reva Rice =

American actress

Reva Rice is an American musical theatre actress and singer, best known for originating the role of Pearl in Starlight Express on Broadway.

== Background ==
Rice was born in Toledo, Ohio to Flute and Pearl Esterine Shields Rice. She began training in dance, theatre, and piano at the age of five, and later graduated from the Boston Conservatory of Music.

== Career ==
After originating the role of Pearl in Starlight Express on Broadway, she subsequently played the role in the London production after its 1992 revision as well as on tour in the US and in Las Vegas.

In 1991 Rice became one of the finalists on the television talent show Star Search.

In 1999, Rice took over Valarie Pettiford's role in the Broadway production of Fosse, based on the work of choreographer Bob Fosse. Rice led the cast in both the US tour and the Japanese production of Fosse.

Her other credits include Velma in Chicago, Smokey Joe's Cafe and the television show The Watcher. She played Roz in the world premiere production of JAM: Just Another Man, a musical about the life of Clint Holmes, at the Judy Bayley Theatre at the University of Nevada, Las Vegas. Rice the standby for The Lady of the Lake in the Las Vegas production of Spamalot and took part in the Las Vegas tryout of the new musical, All In: The Poker Musical.

She performed in the ensemble of the US national tour of the musical version of The Color Purple, understudying the lead character Shug Avery. She performed in David Saxe's Vegas! The Show, at the Saxe Theater at the Planet Hollywood Resort and Casino. She starred in Reva Las Vegas, a 90-minute revue based upon her career from Broadway to Las Vegas.

In June 2018, Rice returned to Starlight Express playing Mama, a female version of Poppa, in the Bochum production.

== Theatre credits ==
- Pearl the Observation Car in Starlight Express (Broadway)
- Pearl the Observation Car in Starlight Express (London)
- Velma Kelly in Chicago
- Roz in JAM: Just Another Man
- The Lady of the Lake (Standby) in Monty Python's Spamalot (Las Vegas)
- Lead Singer in VEGAS! THE SHOW
- Mama the Old Steamer in Starlight Express (Bochum)

== Single ==
In 1993, The New Starlight Express, a cast recording of the revised London production was released featuring Rice as Pearl. As well as singing the solos "Make Up My Heart" and "He'll Whistle At Me", Rice duets on "Next Time You Fall in Love" with Greg Ellis. The track was released as a single.
