= Lon Satton =

American singer and actor (1927–2020)

- Born: Alonzo Louis Lee Staton; February 11, 1927; Jacksonville, Florida, U.S.
- Died: October 30, 2020 (aged 93); London, England
- Other name: Lonnie Sattin
- Education: Temple University
- Occupations: Actor, singer

Lon Satton (born Alonzo Louis Lee Staton; February 11, 1927 – October 30, 2020) was an American singer and actor based in the United Kingdom. He is widely known for originating the role of Poppa in Andrew Lloyd Webber's musical Starlight Express, for which Satton received a 1984 Olivier Award nomination for Best Actor in a Musical. He is sometimes credited as Lonnie Sattin.

== Early life ==
One of nine children, Satton was born in Jacksonville, Florida, in 1927, the son of Church of God in Christ minister C. T. Staton. His family moved to Philadelphia at an early age. Satton attended Temple University, and initially considered following in his father's footsteps as an evangelist, but developed an interest in entertainment after winning a singing contest.

== Career ==
As a singer, Satton performed in many jazz clubs, and for a time was a vocalist under Earl Hines and the Cotton Club Revue. In Chicago, he joined a theatre troupe that saw him begin a career in Off-Broadway and Broadway theatre. He starred opposite Barbara McNair in the 1958 musical The Body Beautiful. He also recorded several records for Capitol Records.

Satton made his film debut with an uncredited part in the B-movie The Human Duplicators (1965). He was the second actor to play Lt. Jack Neal on the soap opera One Life to Live. In the early 1970s, he relocated to the United Kingdom. He played a supporting role as a CIA agent in the James Bond film Live and Let Die (1973).

In 1971, he acted in Emil Dean Zoghby and Ray Pohlman's musical Catch My Soul, at the Prince of Wales Theatre in London with Lance LeGault and Sylvia McNeill. The following year, Satton acted in The Threepenny Opera, at the same venue. In 1977, he acted in Loften Mitchell's musical Bubbling Brown Sugar in London. He sang the Henry Mancini-Leslie Bricusse song "Move ‘Em Out" in 1978's Revenge of the Pink Panther.

Arguably his best known role was as Ramblin' Poppa McCoy in Andrew Lloyd Webber's musical Starlight Express, which satton continuously played from the show's opening in 1984 until 1996. His performance earned him an Olivier Award nomination for an Best Actor in a Musical.

== Personal life ==
Satton had two children with his wife, actress Tina Sattin. His cousin was jazz singer Dakota Staton.

== Filmography ==
=== Film ===
- 1968: For Love of Ivy – Harry
- 1970: The Invincible Six – Mike
- 1970: Hello-Goodbye – Cole Strutter
- 1971: Welcome to the Club – Marshall Bowles
- 1972: Steptoe and Son – Pianist
- 1973: Live and Let Die – Harold Strutter
- 1978: Revenge of the Pink Panther – Sam Spade and the Private Eyes No. 1
- 1990: The March – Jack Harris

=== Television ===
- 1969: One Life to Live – Lieutenant Jack Neal
- 1975: Space 1999 – Benjamin Ouma (1 episode)
- 1975: Quiller – Jim Lane (2 episodes)
- 1994: The Lenny Henry Show – Chief of police (1 episode)
