= Starlight Express (bus) =

The Starlight Express was an express bus service operating between New York City and the Central Virginia city of Charlottesville. It made three weekly runs in each direction. Like Amtrak, it typically required about six and a half hours to make the trip.

== History ==
Two Charlottesville-based businessmen inaugurated this service in 2004 to fill a perceived service gap and chose a name meant to evoke the luxury of storied trains such as the 20th Century Limited and the Orient Express. They were root beer company founder David New and outspoken developer Oliver Kuttner, and they launched with a single repurposed Greyhound bus body outfitted with leather BMW seats and charged $99 each way. Kuttner and New sold the company in 2010.

== Today ==
The Starlight Express, under ownership of A Goff Limo, ceased operation in October, 2018.
