= A Saint She Ain't =

- Music: Denis King
- Lyrics: Dick Vosburgh
- Book: Dick Vosburgh
- Productions: April 21, 1999 King's Head Theatre; September 22, 1999- January 15, 2000 Apollo Theatre

A Saint She Ain't is a musical with lyrics written by Dick Vosburgh and music by Denis King. The piece is inspired by Le Cocu Imaginaire, by Molière, but the story has been updated to an American port in the 1940s. The characters are based on famous performers of the era, such as Jimmy Durante, Mae West, W.C. Fields, and Rita Hayworth. A Saint She Ain't depicts a young couple who, receiving bad information, each believe that the other is unfaithful. The musical deals with the repercussions of love, jealousy, impulsiveness, and deception.

== Plot synopsis ==
The musical is based on Molière's Le Cocu Imaginaire. Set in the 1940s, the play parodies wartime musical movies of that era, with characters based on film stars of that era. Snaveley T. Bogle, based on W. C. Fields, is married to Faye (based on Mae West). Ray Bagalucci (based on Jimmy Durante) has a daughter Anna (based on Rita Hayworth). She is involved with Danny O'Reilly (based on Gene Kelly). The sailors Willoughby and Skip, reminiscent of Abbott and Costello, most notably perform a version of the famous "Who's on First?" routine.

Anna Bagalucci proclaims her intent to marry Danny O'Reilly, a sailor on leave. Anna's father Ray strongly opposes the marriage, as he has always wished that she will marry a rich man. The relationship between Anna and Danny becomes unstable when Anna suspects Danny of infidelity. While this is going on, the aged drunk Bogle sends Danny in a different direction when he suggests that the actual Mrs. Bogle is Anna, not Faye.

After Bogle's remarks, Danny begins to believe that Anna has secretly married. Similarly, Bogle believes that the sex-obsessed Faye has left him for Danny, though her attempts to seduce Danny fail. As the actions reach a climax, the malapropistic Ray attempts to prevent Danny and Anna's wedding, while Willoughby hooks up with Anna's best friend, the dancing Lovette George. In the end, the central conceit is revealed, after which Danny and Anna marry.

== Production history ==
=== 1999 London ===
A Saint She Ain't opened April 21, 1999, at King's Head Theatre in London, in association with Patricia MacNaughton. It was directed by Ned Sherrin, designed by Patrick Connellan, and choreographed by Lindsay Dolan; the musical directing was done by Chris Walker and Denis King. The King's Head Theatre is a dinner theatre, with a small stage and smaller dressing rooms, which director Ned Sherrin cites as the primary reason for the show's transferral. A Saint She Ain't transferred to the West End after a successful six-week run.

=== 1999 West End ===
A Saint She Ain't opened at the Apollo Theatre on September 22, 1999. It was performed by the same cast, except for the parts of Trudy McCloy and one of the Andrews Sisters, which were both performed by new addition Corinna Powelsland. The first preview at the Apollo was September 16, and the show closed January 15, 2000. It was from this performance that the 1999 cast album was recorded.

=== 2002 Massachusetts ===
A Saint She Ain't made its American debut at the Berkshire Theatre Festival in Stockbridge, Massachusetts, from July 30 to August 10, 2002. It was directed by Eric Hill, choreographed by Gerry McIntyre and starred Kate Levering, P. J. Benjamin, Alyson Reed, Lovette George and Joel Blum. After its 11-day run, the show transferred to Westport.

=== 2002 Connecticut ===
A Saint She Ain't opened at the Westport Country Playhouse, in Westport, Connecticut, on August 28, 2002. At this point, it had shown some potential for being produced Off-Broadway, and was being watched closely by Vosburgh representatives during its Westport run. The show ultimately did not move to Manhattan, and A Saint She Ain't ended its run on September 14, 2002.

== Cast ==
2002 Massachusetts actor	Character	Character description
P.J. Benjamin	Snaveley T. Bogle	Faye's husband
Alison Briner	Faye Bogle	Snaveley's wife
Joel Blum	Ray Bagalucci	Anna's father
Christina Marie Norrup	Anna Bagalucci	Ray's daughter
Roland Rusinek	Willoughby Dittenfeller	Sailor
Lovette George	Trudy McCloy	Anna's best friend
Jason Gillman	Danny O'Reilly	Songwriting sailor that Anna is in love with
Jay Russell	Skip Watson	Sailor

== Musical numbers ==
Act 1

- "Overture"
- "Mr. Molière" - The Andrews Sisters
- "Start-The-Day Tune" - Ray Bagalucci
- "The Navy's in Town" - Faye Bogle
- "My All-American Gal" - Danny O'Reilly
- "A Saint She Ain't" - Danny O'Reilly and Snaveley T. Bogle
- "I Love to Hold Rose with the Rolled Hose and the Shing-Shing-Shingled Hair" - Ray Bagalucci and Anna Bagalucci
- "I Only Dig That Jive" - Trudy McCloy and Willoughby Dittenfeller
- "You're the Only Star in My Heaven" - Anna Bagalucci and Danny O'Reilly

Act 2

- "Entr'acte"
- "Manitowoc" - Trudy McCloy
- "There Oughta Be a Way" - Ray Bagalucci
- "The Joke's On Me" - Anna Bagalucci
- "Can't Help Dancing" - Anna Bagalucci and Danny O'Reilly
- "The Banana for My Pie" - Faye Bogle
- "Finaletto" - The Company
- "Finale Ultimo" - The Company

=== Musical analysis ===
The music for A Saint She Ain't was composed by Denis King, arranged by both King and Chris Walker, lyricized by Dick Vosburgh, and performed by King and Walker on two pianos for the original production. Denis King is a musical composer mostly known for his score of the 1977 Royal Shakespeare Theatre's production of Privates on Parade, which won the Ivor Novello award for Best Musical. King's score of A Saint She Ain't has been criticized by Markland Taylor as, "a matter of hurtling from the sublime to the ridiculous", and compared to his music for Peter Nichols' wonderful "Privates on Parade." Despite criticism of the music of A Saint She Ain't, Denis King described the experience as "possibly the most fun I've ever had writing a musical." The music was written for only two pianos, and it is a pastiche of style ranging from jazzy swing to movie musical. From the Evening Standard, Nicholas de Jongh said, "In borrowing from Moliere, A Saint She Ain't becomes a triumph of tongue and cheek." The lyrics are full of puns and malapropisms, such as "Time, like Alan Ladd, is short" and "hum a ditty" for humidity, which lend to the endearing but silly qualities and also negative critiques of this Hollywood spoof. One of the songs, "The Banana For My Pie," is considered the show's most memorable song for its "non-stop, sexual doublespeak designed to outrage the Hays Office (Motion Picture Production Code)." The actual vocal aspect of the musical has widely been considered a bit disappointing overall because the actors and actresses were primarily chosen for their comedic talent as opposed to their vocal ability.

== Response ==
A Saint She Ain't has received several mixed reviews. Richard Forrest, in his What'sOnStage review wrote: "Relying heavily on the sounds of the era, Vosburgh and King's tunes are a foot-tapping blend of boogie woogie, bluesy ballads and close harmonies... In all other respects, A Saint She Ain't is uplifting, high-spirited stuff, ably directed by Ned Sherrin." Ian Shuttleworth wrote: "Denis King's music is absolutely in the mood (pun intended) of the period and genre, and Vosburgh's book and lyrics are jam-packed with gags of the sort that they just don't make any more... Under Ned Sherrin's capable direction, the show occasionally feels either too cosy or, conversely, to be labouring too hard to make the transfer from the King's Head to a venue more than six times as big, but what matters most of all is that it is simply immense fun." Benedict Nightingale, in his The Times review wrote: "The feeling is so ebulliently welcoming we found ourselves helplessly chortling at what we might have sniffily dismissed as Christmas-cracker silliness... Did we laugh? You bet we did."

However, the show received significant criticism from Variety magazine. Markland Taylor wrote, "A sainted classic it ain't. In fact, it's hard to conceive how dreadful Hollywood musical spoof A Saint She Ain't has made its way across the pond from England courtesy of not one but two summer theaters that should know better: the Berkshire Theater Festival and the Westport Country Playhouse...Dick Vosburgh and Denis King's unfortunate concoction does just one thing well: It makes Dames at Sea look and sound like an imperishable masterpiece." Taylor calls Vosburgh's script "loaded to groaning point with puns" and remarks that King's score, "rather than being sharply witty pastiche, is a series of vague approximations of its original inspirations with no personality of their own". New York Magazine's John Simon also chimed in, specifically in regard to the show's caricatures of figures like Mae West, saying " These unsacred cows have been milked too many times to yield much that is potable, let alone palatable, however skilled the hands working the udders."
