= Starlight Sequence =

The Starlight Sequence is a showstopper from Andrew Lloyd Webber's Starlight Express. It is performed by Rusty, a young, naive Steam Locomotive and the Starlight Express, a magical Steam Locomotive that comes at midnight to help Steam Locomotives in need. Rusty, who wants to compete in the world championship railway races, has lost self belief because Greaseball and Electra have been taunting him, and his coach, Pearl has dumped him for faster locomotives. In this number, the Starlight Express, sent by Rusty's father(mother), Poppa(Momma), has come to tell Rusty that true power comes from within.

== Music ==
The music was composed by Andrew Lloyd Webber, and is in the key of E major. It is a highly thematic number, starting with Rusty alone. The tune to Rusty's number, Starlight Express plays. Then, as the Starlight Express joins, he sings the tune of "Only You", a theme not yet heard at this point. He gives Rusty his message through the verse. Rusty then comes back with the Starlight Express theme, to say he doesn't understand. The Starlight Express continues the theme Rusty is singing to explain. Rusty, realising what he is being told, joins the Starlight in the Only You theme, later used by Pearl when she realises that she loves Rusty.

== Lyrics ==
Lyrics are by Richard Stilgoe. The original title for the number was 'I am the Starlight'.

== Choreography/Blocking ==
=== Broadway/London ===
It starts with Rusty, sat alone, centre stage. He would call out the words 'Starlight Express', and he would stand, as the Starlight came to stand behind him. The Starlight Express would be played by the actor who played Poppa, and so he would come on in that costume. Rusty, however, would never turn to see him, and would always be looking up, perhaps based on the idea of a Shoulder Angel. When they both sang the 'Only You' theme, Rusty would go onto his knees, and the Starlight take his hands and raises them above him. The Starlight skates away, leaving Rusty feeling powerful.

==== Bochum ====
It starts with Rusty, sat alone, centre stage. He would call out the words 'Starlight Express'. The Starlight Express, again played by the actor who played Poppa, would not come on, but speak from offstage. When they both sang the 'Only You' theme, Rusty stands and raises his hands above him. He would pick up his helmet at the end.

After the show’s ‘2018-Revamp’, the blocking was updated. Rusty still starting alone, but after twice calling out to the Starlight Express and discarding his helmet, the actress playing Momma would enter at the back of the Stage portraying the voice of the Starlight Express. Also included in the ‘2018-Revap’ was the addition of Drones that circle Rusty at the climax of the number. And for the 2022-23 season, the theatre installed a speciality lift under the stage, in which Rusty would be elevated into the air during the number and engulfed by drones before being lowered for the ending. And for the 2023-24 season, Rusty at the song’s climax would expose a Disco ball in his chest which would dramatically reflect off the lightning.

==== US/UK tours ====
It starts with Rusty, sat alone, centre stage. He would call out the words 'Starlight Express'. The Starlight Express, would sing as an OV, rather than appearing onstage. This time, however, Rusty can see the Starlight, rather than the audience, and looks directly above them, to a light shining down on him, with 'stars' shining all around. When they both sing the 'Only You' theme, Rusty is lifted into the air amongst the stars, coming down to pick up his helmet at the end.

== Recordings ==
- Original London Cast Recording - Ray Shell and Lon Satton (1984)
- Broadway Concept Recording - Peter Hewlett & Richie Havens (1987)
- The New Starlight Express - Greg Ellis and Lon Satton (1992)
- William Woods (Piano arrangement, 2000)
- Orlando Pops (2002)

== See also ==
- Make Up My Heart
- Starlight Express
- U.N.C.O.U.P.L.E.D.
- Only You
- Light at the End of the Tunnel
