= Smoking car =

Railroad car in which smoking is allowed

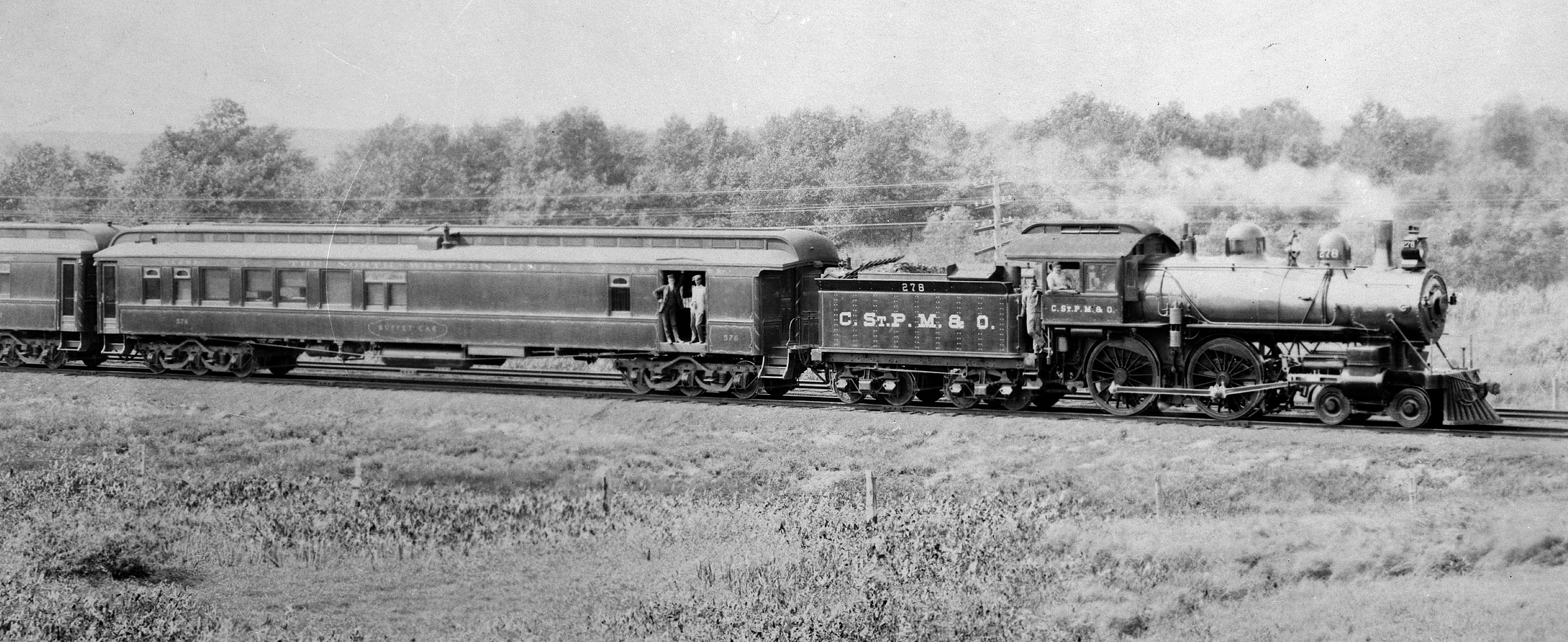
Smoking cars, like this combine car, were typically carried at one end of the train so passengers could move through other coaches and sleeping cars to reach the dining car without passing through smoke.

A smoking car was a type of railroad car where smoking by passengers was allowed when prohibited in other parts of the passenger train.

During the late 19th century, when relatively few women smoked, North American passenger trains kept the majority of passenger seating areas smoke-free by including isolated areas for smoking. Longer trains might include one or two open coaches designated type PN by the American Railway Association while shorter trains might include a combine car designated type CS with a bulkhead separating two compartments. One compartment was used for transporting baggage, while the other had seating for passengers. These smoking cars had floors without carpeting and seats were often without upholstery to minimize damage by hot ashes. The cars often had spittoons and some included a bar.

The smoking car, sometimes called a club car, was regarded as a place where men could relax, entertaining each other with songs and stories of off-color humor without offending other passengers. Some men who didn't smoke enjoyed the atmosphere, claiming the smoke kept away insects and contagious diseases. Smoking on Amtrak was prohibited in 1993 through an internal policy and officially banned and extended to electronic cigarettes by the Banning Smoking on Amtrak Act of 2019.

Most European railways allowed smoking in 25 to 50% of the seats until total smoking bans were introduced around 2005 to 2007.
