= Orvin – Champion of Champions =

2003 musical play by Alan Ayckbourn

Orvin - Champion of Champions
- Original language: English
- Written by: Alan Ayckbourn
- Characters: Orvin; Albern; Dedrick; Skeets; Varian; Delcine; Ola; Archbishop; Ulmar; Walmund; Mayor of Zeva; Courtier
- Subject: Swashbuckling adventure
- Genre: Children's fantasy
- Setting: The kingdom of Presupposia

Premiere
- Date: 8 August 2003
- Place: Stephen Joseph Theatre, Scarborough
- Official website

Orvin – Champion Of Champions is a 2003 musical play by British playwright Alan Ayckbourn, with music by Denis King. It was one of his few plays written for performance entirely by children, and, after the usual première at the Stephen Joseph Theatre, went on to be performed at the National Youth Music Theatre. It is about a squire named Orvin who accidentally ends up the last man alive in a great battle, and, unwittingly assuming the role of his late master Ulmar, finds himself the centre of a power-struggle and arranged marriage in the land of Presupposia.
