= Whenever (play) =

2000 children's musical play with words by Alan Ayckbourn and music by Denis King

- Original language: English
- Written by: Alan Ayckbourn / Denis King
- Characters: Emily; Clara; Uncle Marin; Uncle Lucas; Oscar Fieldman; Ziggi; Hoombean
- Subject: Time travel
- Genre: Children's musical

Premiere
- Date: 5 December 2000
- Place: Stephen Joseph Theatre, Scarborough
- Official website

Whenever is a 2000 children's musical play with words by Alan Ayckbourn and music by Denis King, that was shown as the Stephen Joseph Theatre's Christmas production. It is loosely derived from The Wizard of Oz, and it is about a young Victorian girl named Emily to travels back and forth in time to avert a disaster.

== External links and references ==
- Whenever page on Alan Ayckbourn official website
