= Starlight Express =

1984 musical by Andrew Lloyd Webber

- Logo for the Japan/Australia tour, 1987–1988
- Music: Andrew Lloyd Webber (Note: Additional music by Alastair Lloyd Webber)
- Lyrics: Richard Stilgoe (Note: Additional lyrics by Lauren Aquilina, Don Black, Nick Coler and David Yazbek)
- Productions: 1984 West End; 1987 Broadway; 1987 Australasia Tour; 1988 Bochum; 1989 US Tour; 1990 Second Japan Condition; 1993 Las Vegas; 1997 Mexico City; 1997 US on ice tour 2003 US Tour; 2004 UK Tour; 2009 New Zealand Tour; 2012 UK Tour; 2013 Asia Tour; 2013 Johannesburg; 2013 Tuacahn; 2017 UK Workshop; 2024 Wembley; 2027 International Tour

Starlight Express is a 1984 musical with music by Andrew Lloyd Webber and lyrics by Richard Stilgoe. It tells the story of a young but obsolete steam engine, Rusty, that races in a championship against modern locomotives of diesel and electric engines in the hope of impressing a first-class/observation car, Pearl. The actors perform on roller skates.

Running for 7,409 performances in London, Starlight Express is the tenth-longest-running West End show. It is the most successful musical in Germany, where it has been performed in a purpose-built theatre since 1988, holding the Guinness World Record for most visitors to a musical in a single theatre.

== Background ==
Starlight Express has its roots in three abandoned projects. In 1974, Lloyd Webber approached author Reverend W. Awdry about adapting Awdry's book series The Railway Series as an animated TV series. Following the meeting, Lloyd Webber started composing, with actor and children's TV writer Peter Reeves contributing lyrics, alongside artist Brian Cosgrove animating for it. They pitched their material to Granada TV, who commissioned a pilot episode. The episode was completed in early 1976, but Granada ultimately decided not to produce a full series as they feared that Awdry's stories were not then popular enough outside the UK to justify investing the time and money needed to make the series. Ironically, the Thomas & Friends series later premiered seven months after Starlight Express and became highly successful.

After withdrawing from the project, Lloyd Webber heard a recording of an American soul singer, Earl Jordan, who could sing three notes at once in the style of a steam whistle. Lloyd Webber and Peter Reeves wrote a novelty pop song for Jordan called "Engine of Love," released in 1977. The song failed to chart, but "Engine of Love" went on to feature in some productions of Starlight Express and the melody was also later used for "He'll Whistle At Me".

Around the same time as writing "Engine of Love", an American TV station invited Lloyd Webber to compose songs for a railway-themed animated film of Cinderella. In this version of the story, the Prince would hold a competition to decide which Engine would pull the royal train across the United States of America. Cinderella would be a steam engine, and the ugly sisters would be a diesel engine and an electric engine. The project went into development hell, but Lloyd Webber remained interested in telling a story with anthropomorphic trains.

Starlight Express proper began in early 1981. Lloyd Webber asked lyricist Richard Stilgoe to help him revive the idea as a concert for schools, in the style of Lloyd Webber's breakthrough musical, Joseph and the Amazing Technicolor Dreamcoat. Lloyd Webber and Stilgoe presented two songs the following summer at the Sydmonton Festival, Lloyd Webber's private event for showcasing new work. The director Trevor Nunn watched the performance and offered to help develop the material from something "twee" to something with more "spectacle and theatre magic".

Together, Lloyd Webber, Stilgoe and Nunn developed the story to include the idea of trains and coaches racing. The choreographer Arlene Phillips was brought on board along with the designer John Napier, who suggested staging the show on roller skates.

In 1983, the first act of Starlight Express was workshopped by Nunn and Phillips with a cast that included the comedian Tracey Ullman. Based on the workshop's success, Starlight Express began full-scale production, opening in the West End in March 1984.

== Synopsis ==
Starlight Express has been revised many times since it was first produced. These revisions range from tweaks to lyrics to adding or removing entire songs, characters and subplots. The fundamental story, however, has stayed the same.

This synopsis reflects the show as it was first produced, in the West End in 1984.

=== Act 1 ===
A young boy falls asleep while playing with his toy trains, announcing it is race night. In his dreams, the trains come to life.

The reigning champion – a diesel engine from the U.S.A. called Greaseball – enters with his cavalcade train of several other diesel engines. They boast of diesel's supremacy ("Rolling Stock"). Next, a steam engine called Rusty enters. Greaseball mocks Rusty, who replies that he will win the championship, despite steam being obsolete compared to diesel ("Call Me Rusty"). The dreaming boy, Control, intervenes and orders Rusty to collect a passenger train from the marshalling yard. He returns with four coaches that make up the passenger train: a dining car called Dinah, a smoking car called Ashley, a buffet car called Buffy, and an observation car called Pearl. Control sends Rusty away to fetch a freight train as the coaches introduce themselves to the audience ("A Lotta Locomotion"). Greaseball returns. He boasts again, this time to the coaches ("Pumping Iron"). Rusty returns with the six trucks that make up the freight train: three boxcars called Rocky 1, Rocky 2 and Rocky 3, a brick truck called Flat-Top, an aggregate hopper called Dustin and a caboose called C.B. They introduce themselves to the audience and argue with the coaches over whether it is preferable to carry people or cargo ("Freight").

Control declares entries for the championship open. Six trains arrive to challenge Greaseball: Bobo, the French Sud-Est; Espresso, the Italian Settebello; Weltschaft, the German Class 103; Turnov, the Trans-Siberian Express from Russia; Hashamoto, the Japanese Shinkansen Bullet Train; and the City of Milton Keynes, the Advanced Passenger Train from Great Britain. Entries are about to close when a surprise entry – an electric engine called Electra – arrives. Accompanied by his train of five components – an armaments truck called Krupp, a repair truck called Wrench, a money truck called Purse, a freezer truck called Volta and an animal truck called Joule – Electra declares that electricity is the future of the railways ("AC/DC"). Greaseball and Electra square up to each other as the entrants form a parade to celebrate the race ("Coda of Freight").

Control announces the rules of the championship: the trains will compete in pairs, with an engine pulling a coach. There will be three elimination heats, and the winner of each heat will move on to the finals to decide the fastest train. The engines start to pick their coaches. Rusty offers to race with Pearl, but she rejects him, explaining that she is waiting for her 'dream train' ("He Whistled at Me"). Electra's messenger, Purse, enters with an invitation from Electra. Even though Electra is not her dream train, she accepts, leaving Rusty alone.

The first heat pits Greaseball and Dinah against Espresso, Buffy, Hashimoto, and C.B. C.B. sabotages Hashimoto by applying his brakes at critical moments in the race and then letting him derail before crossing the finish line. Greaseball and Dinah win comfortably, claiming a place in the finals. After the race, Dinah objects to Greaseball's cheating. In response, he abandons her, and C.B. comforts Dinah ("There's Me"). Meanwhile, a lonely Rusty has retreated to the freight yard where the former champion – an old steam engine called Poppa – sings a blues song to the trucks ("Poppa's Blues"). Poppa tries to persuade Rusty to race without Pearl, urging him to believe in the Starlight Express. When Rusty refuses, Poppa introduces him to an old Pullman car called Memphis Belle ("Belle The Sleeping Car"). Rusty agrees to race with Belle. They compete in the second heat against Electra, Pearl, Weltschaft, and Joule. Electra and Pearl finish first, securing a place in the finals; Rusty and Belle finish last.

Already despondent after losing Pearl as his race partner, Rusty loses his last shreds of confidence. Poppa decides to step up and prove that steam power is still relevant, despite everyone's misgivings, by racing himself in the third heat. Only Dustin is willing to run with him. Rusty points out that the race is already whole, but suddenly, Control announces that the British train has been scrapped, leaving space for a late entry. Poppa interprets this as a sign from the Starlight Express and enters the race. The third heat pits Poppa and Dustin against Bobo, Ashley, Turnov and Wrench. Poppa wins the race, securing a place in the finals against Greaseball and Electra, but the effort of outracing the others and pulling the hefty Dustin exhausts him. Now worn out and half-dead, he begs Rusty to take his place. Rusty refuses at first, but then he notices Pearl with Electra and is jealous, which leads Rusty to announce that he will take Poppa's place. Greaseball and the other competitors mock him and then leave. Alone, Rusty prays to the supposedly mythical Starlight Express for help in the final ("Starlight Express").

=== Act 2 ===
The trains debate whether Rusty should be allowed to take Poppa's place in the finals since he's already competed and lost or whether the place should go to Bobo, who finished second in Poppa's heat ("The Rap"). They ultimately decide to let Rusty race. Control offers the engines the chance to change partners. Pearl abandons Electra and joins Greaseball, leaving Dinah feeling betrayed. Dinah expresses shame at being uncoupled, although she cannot speak the word itself ("U.N.C.O.U.P.L.E.D."). Ashley, Buffy, and Belle try to persuade Dinah to fight for Greaseball's affection ("Rolling Stock (Reprise)"/"Girls' Rolling Stock") before going with Electra to replace Pearl in the finals. Elsewhere, C.B. hatches a plan. He tells Greaseball and Electra he will help them by crashing Rusty in the final, when the latter expresses his surprise at C.B.'s duplicity, C.B. explains that he has spent a career secretly causing train crashes for fun ("C.B.").

The finals take place between Electra and Dinah, Greaseball and Pearl, and Rusty and C.B. C.B. sabotages Rusty, slowing him down so he misses a movable bridge that is part of the course and cannot finish the race. Electra and Greaseball finish in a dead heat. Control announces that there will be another race, with Electra and Greaseball going head-to-head to decide the winner. Rusty complains that he was cheated, but the marshals refuse to listen. Pearl confronts Greaseball after hearing him gloating with CB and Electra about how seamless the sabotage was, but he warns her to say nothing, as the marshals would also consider her complicit and punish her. Rusty retreats to the freight yard, where he bumps into the Rockies. They tell him he will never win without luck and should give up ("Right Place, Right Time"). The Rockies leave Rusty alone. He appeals again to the mythical Starlight Express for help, and this time, it hears. The Starlight Express, which is portrayed by the same actor as Poppa, appears in front of Rusty. The Starlight Express reminds Rusty that he already possesses the strength he needs if he believes in himself, inspiring him to enter the rerun of the final race. ("I Am The Starlight"). The Starlight Express disappears, and Rusty finds himself back in the freight yard with Dustin, who says he was asleep but felt the starlight's presence. Rusty asks Dustin to race with him in the final. He accepts, and they head off together.

Moments before the race, Dinah, angry with how Electra treats her, disconnects from him. Electra quickly appeals to C.B. to take her place. The trains gather to watch what they expect will be a head-to-head final between Greaseball and Pearl and Electra and C.B.. Suddenly, Rusty arrives with Dustin, and the marshals allow him to enter the race. The race is fast and furious. This time, the downhill track turns Dustin's weight into an advantage for Rusty. Greaseball struggles with an unwilling Pearl holding him back, and Electra uses all his power to disrupt his opponents. Pearl is distracted by Rusty's presence, causing Greaseball to uncouple her at full speed. Rusty diverts from the race course just in time to save her but at the cost of falling into a distant third place. The now partner-less Greaseball and Electra dispute over the lead but suddenly CB abandons Electra and couples up to Greaseball, leaving Electra to disappear backstage for the rest of the race. Rusty and Dustin are able to overtake and right next to the finish line Greaseball and CB crash, allowing Rusty to win the race. But instead of celebrating, he leaves immediately to find Pearl. Control warns that Rusty will cancel his lap of honor if he does not return quickly.

Meanwhile, humiliated and infuriated, Electra leaves the race track, swearing never to return ("No Comeback"). Greaseball and C.B. emerge in a tangled wreck. They lament the heavy toll their wreck and racing in general has taken on them ("One Rock 'n' Roll Too Many"). Poppa demands that Greaseball and C.B. help find Rusty. Away from the other engines, Pearl fears that she caused Rusty to lose the race. She realises that of all the trains she's raced with, only Rusty acted selflessly towards her ("Only He"). Rusty arrives. He tells Pearl that he won the race and confesses his love for her ("Only You"). The other trains arrive. Greaseball finally apologises to Dinah for his behaviour, and they reconcile. Greaseball complains that he's finished as a racer, but Poppa offers to rebuild him into a steam engine. Control tries to assert some control, announcing that Rusty's lap of honour is cancelled. Tired of Control's behaviour, Poppa and the other engines tell Control to "shut it" and celebrate the second coming of steam power ("Light at the End of the Tunnel").

== Characters ==
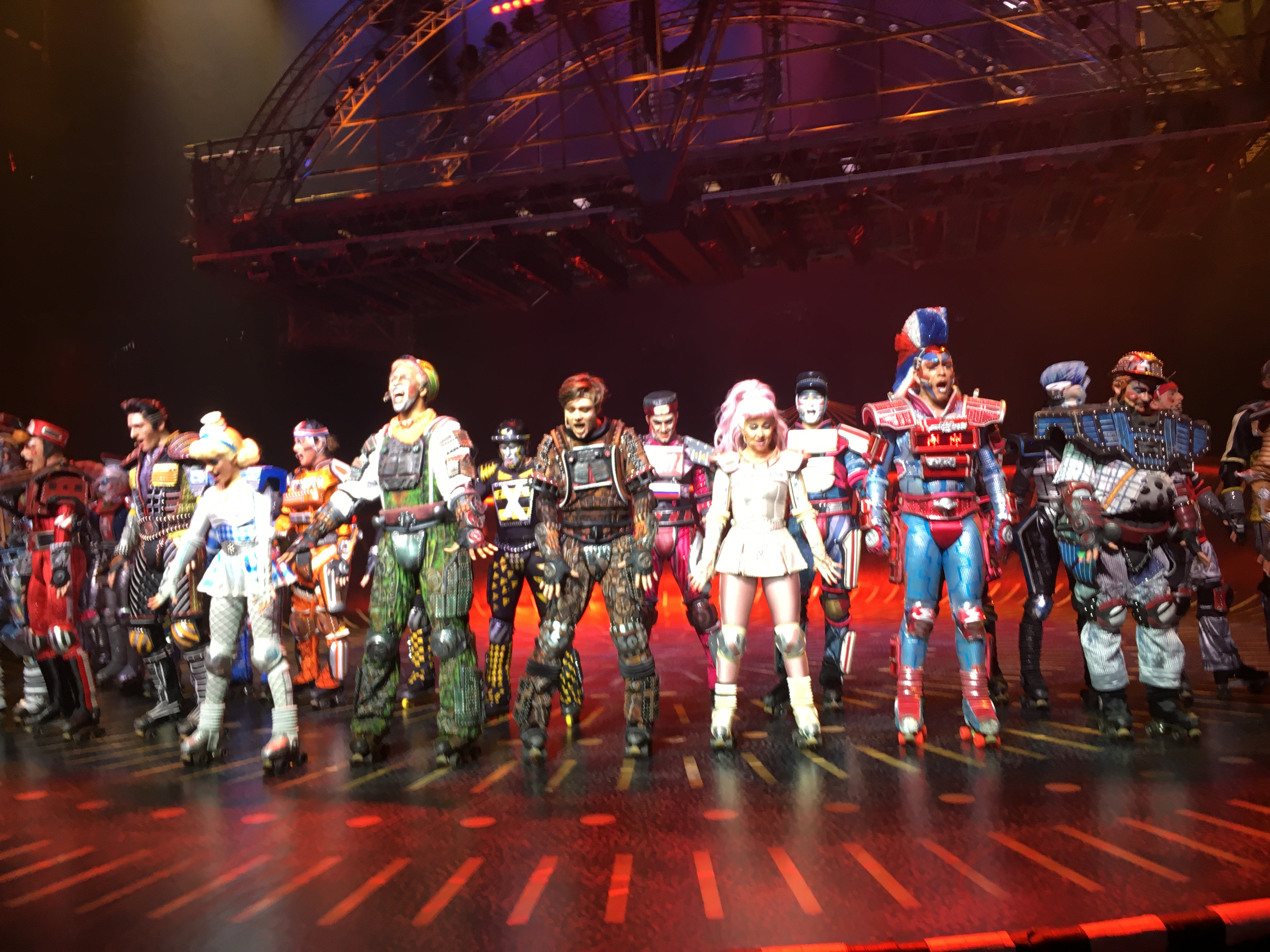
Bochum cast, 2018

Voices only Note: these characters appear onstage as people in the 2024 Wembley production (from October 2025)

- Control – A child playing with toy trains, which become the characters featured in the musical.
- Mum – Control's mother. Is also portrayed by the same cast member as Momma McCoy in the 2024 Wembley production.

Engines

- Rusty – the play's protagonist. He is a steam shunting engine who longs to enter the race and win the heart of Pearl.
- Ramblin' Poppa/Momma McCoy – the old steam engine who was once a racing champion, is the predecessor of Rusty and now acts as a mentor and guardian to him and the freight trucks.
- Greaseball – the macho Union Pacific diesel engine formerly crowned by Control as the reigning champion and one of the play's antagonists.
- Electra – a futuristic electric engine known as "the Engine of the Future" and one of the play's main antagonists.

Coaches

- Pearl the Observation Car – the newest 1st class observation car searching for her "dream train".
- Dinah the Dining Car is a sweet, romantic, lovable dining car.
- Ashley the Smoking Car – a wise, smoky and sexy smoking car who oftens acts as a big sister-figure to the group.
- Buffy the Buffet Car – a smart, sassy, hot, cheap, quick buffet car.
- (Memphis) Belle the Sleeping Car – an old but luxurious Pullman 1st class sleeping car from the U.S.A. (designated as a Pullman car in 1984, cut from all productions after 1987 Broadway)
- Duvay the Sleeping Car- A near constantly-exhausted, sassy sleeping car. (replaced Ashley in the 2012 U.K. tour and licensed amateur productions)
- Carrie the Luggage Car- A peppy, feminist baggage car. (replaced Buffy in the 30th Anniversary Bochum production)
- Belle the Bar Car- A big sister-like bar car (replaced Ashley in the 30th Anniversary Bochum production. No relation to Memphis Belle or 2017 Belle)
- Tassita the Quiet Car- A sassy quiet car, who becomes the first male coach in Starlight Express' history in the 2024 London production. (replaced Buffy in the 2017 workshop at The Other Palace Theatre in London and 2024 London revival)
- Belle the Sleeping Car- A laid-back sleeping car. (replaced Ashley and featured in the 2017 workshop at The Other Palace Theatre in London and 2024 London revival. No relation to Memphis Belle)

National champions / Engines

These minor characters have frequently been renamed and substituted throughout various productions.

- Bobo/Coco – the TGV Sud-Est or Eurostar engine from France.
- Espresso – the Settebello or Linguine/Pizza Express engine from Italy.
- Weltschaft/Ruhrgold/The Flying Hamburger/Rhinegold – the Class 103, or ICE engine from Germany.
- Turnov – the Trans-Siberian Express engine from Russia/the USSR.
- Hashimoto/Hashimoto/Nintendo/Nakamura/Yamamoto/Manga – the Shinkansen Bullet Train from Japan.
- The City of Milton Keynes/The Prince of Wales/Brexit – the Advanced Passenger, British Royal or "Train to Nowhere" from Great Britain. (cut from arena tours, Pre-2018 Bochum & 2024 London revival)
- Silver Bullet- An over-confident, speeding powerhouse. (replaced Japanese Engine in 2024 London revival)
- Orange Flash- A strong-willed yet clumsy racer. (replaced German Engine in the 2024 London revival)
- Golden Eagle- A hot-headed locomotive, who seems to be quite close to Greaseball. (replaced French Engine in the 2024 London revival)
- Blue Lightning- A powerful racer. (replaced Russian/Swiss Engine in the 2024 London revival)
- Green Arrow- A rule-abiding, aggressive engine. (replaced Italian Engine in the 2024 London revival)
- Ticktack- The elegant, serene and confident Glacier Express from Switzerland. (Replaced Turnov in 2026 revision to Bochum show)

(Starlight Express on Ice also included Canuck, the Canadian Engine and Cesar, the Mexican Engine. Expreso Astral had Carioca, the Brazilian Engine, El Pibe, the Argentinian Engine; and Conan, the Orient Express from Europe.)

Freight trucks

- Rocky 1, 2, 3 and 4 – a quartet of boxcars. Rocky 4 was introduced to Broadway and Bochum in 1987, following the release of "Rocky IV", although he was quickly removed.
- Hip Hopper 1, 2 and 3- A trio of up-beat hopper cars dressed to look like Hip-Hop artists with graffiti and bling being a common addition to their costume design. (replaced the Rockies in the US/UK Tours and the revised Bochum production)
- Flat-Top – a brick truck who longs to become a new member of Greaseball's gang.
- Dustin – a giant iron aggregate hopper who is a friend of Rusty. He is shy and sensitive about his weight.
- C.B./The Red Caboose/Caboose – a brake truck. He is a two-faced mischief-maker who causes disaster wherever he goes. A central character and the villain in the original plot, he was cut during the 1992 revisions to the London production, although he remained a main character in most other shows, with the exception of Las Vegas, CDMX, the 3D Tours and 2000s Bochum revision.
- Slick – A punky, chaotic oil truck who is against Hydrogen and presumably other eco-friendly fuels, and reveals herself to be a mercenary/hitwoman who is willing to crash trains for money. However, to the dismay of Greaseball and Electra, she is not very loyal to anyone. (replaced C.B. and Flat-Top, fulfilling C.B.'s role in sabotaging the races in Act 2 of the 2024 London production and singing "Wide Smile", but also having Flat-Top's attitude and lines.)
- Lumber – a hopeful wood truck, forced by Slick to help her sabotage Rusty in the "Uphill Final" (replaced one or more of Rockies/Hip Hoppers in the 2024 London production.)
- Porter – a proud coal truck, also forced by Slick to assist in wrecking Rusty. (replaced one or more of Rockies/Hip Hoppers in the 2024 London production.)
- Hydra – a confident, laid-back hydrogen truck, ostracized at first due to their experimental nature and pollution-free fuel before redeeming themself by helping Rusty win the "Downhill Final" with their fuel and extra weight. (replaced Dustin in the 2024 London production)

Electra's entourage of components

- Krupp the Armaments Truck – Electra's stern bodyguard. (removed from the US/UK Tours and the Bochum production in 2017 and the London revival in 2024)
- Wrench the Repair Truck - Electra's aggressive repair truck.
- Purse the Money Truck - Electra's proud money truck and messenger. (removed from the 2018 30th Anniversary Bochum Production and the 2024 London revival)
- Volta the Freezer Truck - Electra's ice-cold reefer car.
- Joule the Animal/Dynamite Truck - Electra's hot-headed stock car/Dynamite truck.
- Killerwatt the Security Truck - Electra's stoic bodyguard and messenger. (replaced Krupp and Purse in the 30th Anniversary Bochum Production and the 2024 London revival)

Ensemble

- Trax/The Track/Flying Marshal 1 and 2 – a duo of trick-skating stunt performers who wear rollerblades rather than quad skates and function as race marshals but do not sing. They wield the start and finish flags at the beginning and end of the races, tow crashed engines off the track and decide on the outcome of the aborted "Uphill Final" after The Red Caboose's/Slick's sabotage and the resulting wreck.
- The 2nd and 3rd Class Sleeping Cars – initially portrayed by the same performers as Joule and Volta in the original 1984 production and removed during the show's Broadway run, due to Pumping Iron now happening just after AC/DC.
- The Gang – a gang of unruly diesel engines and freight trucks who follow Greaseball.

== Musical numbers ==
The musical numbers in Starlight Express have changed many times since the first production opened in 1984. Each new production is "re-invented ... rewritten, rearranged, restaged and brought up to date ... rather than just [being] a copy of the original". This is because the show was envisaged as an introduction to live theatre for young audiences, particularly audiences "for whom theatre was a no-go zone". The score is grounded in popular music, which changes with each generation. Therefore, as Lloyd Webber has said, "Starlight Express by its nature has to change".

Later productions have used additional songs with lyrics by Don Black, David Yazbek, Nick Coler and Lauren Aquilina, and with music by Andrew Lloyd Webber's son, Alastair.

This list shows the musical numbers in the original West End production, which have been added or removed over the years.

Act 1

- Overture – Control
- Rolling Stock – Greaseball and Gang
- Taunting Rusty – Rusty, Greaseball, Gang
- Call Me Rusty – Rusty, Pearl, Dinah, Buffy and Ashley
- Rusty, You Can't Be Serious – Rusty, Pearl, Dinah, Buffy and Ashley
- A Lotta Locomotion – Dinah, Ashley, Buffy and Pearl (Note: Song no longer used in any "Starlight Express" production.)
- Pumping Iron – Greaseball, Pearl, Ashley, Dinah, Buffy, 2nd and 3rd class Sleepers
- Freight – Pearl, Ashley, Dinah, Buffy, Rocky I, Rocky II, Rocky III, C.B., Dustin, Flat-Top
- Entry of the National Engines – The Company
- AC/DC – Electra, Krupp, Wrench, Purse, Joule, Volta and Company
- Coda of Freight – The Company
- Hitching and Switching – The Company
- He Whistled at Me – Pearl
- Pearl, You've Been Honored – Purse, Pearl, Rusty
- Race: Heat 1 – Greaseball, Dinah, Espresso, Buffy, Hashimoto, C.B.
- That Was Unfair – Dinah, Greaseball, C.B.
- There's Me – C.B.
- Poppa's Blues – Poppa, Rocky I, Rocky II, Rocky III, Rusty
- Belle the Sleeping Car – Belle
- Starlight Introduction – Poppa, Belle, Rusty
- Race: Heat 2 – Electra, Pearl, Weltschaft, Joule, Rusty, Belle
- Boy, Boy, Boy – Poppa, Rusty, Belle, Trucks
- Race: Heat 3 – Bobo, Ashley, Turnov, Wrench, Poppa, Dustin
- Laughing Stock – The Company
- Starlight Express – Rusty

Act 2

- The Rap – The Company
- Pearl Twirl – Greaseball, Pearl, Dinah, Buffy, Ashley
- U.N.C.O.U.P.L.E.D. – Dinah
- Girls' Rolling Stock – Dinah, Belle, Ashley and Buffy
- C.B. – C.B., Electra, Krupp, Wrench, Purse, Joule, Volta
- Race: Uphill Final – Greaseball, Pearl, Electra, Dinah, Rusty, C.B.
- I Was Robbed – C.B., Rusty, Greaseball and Pearl
- Right Place, Right Time – Rocky I, Rocky II, Rocky III
- I Am The Starlight – Rusty, Starlight Express
- Rusty and Dustin – Rusty, Dustin
- Dinah's Disco – Dinah, Electra, Krupp, Wrench, Purse, Volta, Joule, C.B.
- Race: Downhill Final – Greaseball, Pearl, Electra, C.B., Rusty, Dustin
- No Comeback – Electra, Krupp, Wrench, Purse, Joule, Volta
- One Rock & Roll Too Many – Greaseball, C.B.
- Only He – Pearl
- Only You – Pearl, Rusty
- Light at the End of the Tunnel – The Company

The New Starlight Express (1992)

- Overture – Control, Mom
- Entry of National Engines – Control, Bobo, Espresso, Ruhrgold, Turnov, Nintendo, The Prince of Wales.
- Rolling Stock – Greaseball, Gang, Nationals
- Taunting Rusty – Rusty, Nationals Engines, Gang
- Call Me Rusty – Rusty, Pearl, Dinah, Buffy, Ashley
- Rusty, Can't Be Serious – Pearl, Dinah, Ashley, Buffy
- A Lotta Locomotion – Pearl, Dinah, Buffy, Ashley
- He'll Whistle at Me – Pearl, Dinah, Ashley, Buffy, Pearl
- Freight – Pearl, Ashley, Dinah, Buffy, Rocky 1, Rocky 2, Rocky 3, Dustin, Flat-Top
- AC/DC – Electra, Krupp, Wrench, Purse, Joule, Volta, Company
- Pumping Iron – Greaseball, Coaches, Joule, Volta, Wrench
- Coda of Freight – The Company
- Hitching and Switching – Control, Buffy, Ashley, Pearl, Rusty
- Crazy – Rusty, Pearl, Coaches
- Pearl, You've Been Honoured – Pearl, Rusty, Purse
- Make Up My Heart – Pearl, Rusty
- Race One – Control, Greaseball, Dinah, Nintendo, Krupp, Espresso, Buffy, Electra, Pearl
- Poppa's Blues – Poppa, Rockies, Flat-Top, Rocky 2, Dustin
- Rusty, Why You Looking Sad? – Rockies, Poppa, Rusty, Dustin
- Starlight Short – Poppa, Control, Rusty, Rocky 1, Flat-Top, Dustin
- Race Two – Control, Poppa, Dustin, Bobo, Ashley, Turnov, Wrench, Ruhrgold, Joule
- Laughing Stock – Poppa, Rusty, Greaseball, Gang, Freight, Electra, Pearl, Components, Carriages, Bobo
- Starlight Express – Rusty
- The Rap – The Company
- Pearl Whirl – Greaseball, Pearl, Dinah, Electra, Ashley, Buffy
- U.N.C.O.U.P.L.E.D. – Dinah
- Rolling Stock (Reprise) – Buffy, Ashley, Dinah
- Dinah, You're Honoured – Purse, Dinah, Ashley, Buffy, Rusty
- Race Three – Control, Greaseball, Pearl, Electra, Dinah, Bobo, Ashley, Rusty, Buffy
- Terrorising Rusty – Greaseball, Electra, Gang, Flat-Top, Rusty, Prince of Wales, Turnov, Pearl
- Right Place Right Time – Rocky 1, Rocky 2, Rocky 3, Rusty
- Rusty Alone – Rusty
- Starlight Sequence – Rusty, Starlight
- Rusty and Dustin – Rusty, Dustin
- Dinah's Disco – Dinah, Electra, Buffy
- Pre-Race Four – The Company
- Race Four – Control, Greaseball, Pearl, Electra, Buffy, Bobo, Ashley, Rusty, Dustin
- One Rock 'N' Roll To Many – Electra, Greaseball
- Where's Rusty Gone? – The Company
- Next Time You Fall In Love – Pearl, Rusty
- Rusty, King Of The Track – The company, Control, Dinah, Greaseball, Poppa, Electra
- Light At The End Of The Tunnel – Poppa, Company
- Megamix – Company
- Playout – The Band

Additional songs

These songs have been added to various incarnations of the show:

- "Engine of Love" (replacing "Call Me Rusty")
- "This Is Gonna Be The Day" (replacing "Call Me Rusty")
- "He'll Whistle at Me" – (Replacing "He Whistled At Me"
- "Crazy" (replacing "Call Me Rusty")
- "Make Up My Heart" (replacing "He Whistled at Me")
- "Next Time You Fall in Love" (lyrics by Don Black) (replacing "Only He"/"Only You")
- "A Whole Lotta Locomotion" (lyrics by David Yazbek) (replacing "A Lotta Locomotion")
- "I Do" (music Alastair Lloyd-Webber, lyrics by Nick Coler) (replacing "Only He"/"Only You")
- "I Got Me"/"I Am Me" (lyrics by Lauren Aquilina) (replacing "A Whole Lotta Locomotion")
- "Hydrogen" (replacing "Rusty and Dustin"), sung by Rusty and Hydra.

Starlight Express (Wembley 2024)

(Songs in italics are not included in the programme and are short recit scenes between major musical numbers.)

Act 1

- Overture / Entry of Trains - Momma and Control / Champions
- Rolling Stock - Greaseball and Company
- Crazy - Rusty, Dinah, Belle, Tassita, and Company
- Taunting Rusty - Greaseball, Coaches, Champions
- Call Me Rusty - Rusty and Company
- Introduction Pearl - Pearl, Greaseball, Rusty, Champions, Coaches
- I Am Me - Pearl, Dinah, Belle and Tassita
- Whistle At Me - Pearl and Rusty
- Freight - Fuel Trucks, Coaches and Company
- AC/DC - Electra, Components and Company
- Pumping Iron - Greaseball and Company
- Coda of Freight - Full Company
- Hitching and Switching - Control
- Crazy (Reprise) - Rusty, Pearl
- Pearl, You've Been Honoured - Killerwatt, Pearl, Rusty
- Make Up My Heart - Pearl
- Hydrogen (Section Two) / Pre-Race One - Fuel Trucks
- Race One - Greaseball, Dinah, Blue Lightning, Lumber, Electra, Pearl, Silver Bullet, Belle
- Momma's Blues - Momma, Fuel Trucks
- Rusty Why You Looking Sad - Momma, Rusty, Fuel Trucks
- Race Two - Golden Eagle, Joule, Orange Flash, Tassita, Green Arrow, Volta, Momma, Hydra
- Laughing Stock - Full Company
- Starlight Express - Rusty

Act 2

- The Rap - Full Company
- Pearl Twirl - Greaseball, Pearl, Dinah
- U.N.C.O.U.P.L.E.D. - Dinah, Belle and Tassita
- Dinah, You're Honoured - Killerwatt, Dinah, Belle
- Wide Smile - Slick and Company
- Race Three - Greaseball, Pearl, Electra, Dinah, Rusty, Slick, Porter, Lumber
- I Was Robbed - Greaseball, Electra, Rusty, Pearl, Slick, Champions
- Starlight Sequence - Starlight Express and Rusty
- Hydrogen - Hydra and Rusty
- Dinah's Disco - Dinah, Electra, Slick
- Pre-Race Four - Full Company
- Race Four - Greaseball, Pearl, Electra, Slick, Rusty, Hydra
- One Rock & Roll Too Many - Electra, Greaseball, Slick
- Where's Rusty Gone - Full Company
- I Do - Rusty and Pearl
- Rusty King of the Track - Full Company
- Light at the End of the Tunnel - Momma and Full Company
- Finale - Full Company

== Production history ==
=== West End (1984–2002) ===
1984 London poster

==== The original production (1984–1992) ====
The first production of Starlight Express opened on 27 March 1984 at the Apollo Victoria Theatre. It was directed by Trevor Nunn. Arlene Phillips created the roller-skating choreography. John Napier designed the set, which featured race tracks extending from the stage into the auditorium, as well as a six-tonne steel bridge which lifted and tilted to connect the various levels of the set.

The original cast included Stephanie Lawrence, Frances Ruffelle, Jeff Shankley, Jeffrey Daniel, P. P. Arnold, and Ray Shell.

The production received some minor updates after the Broadway show opened, bringing some new material across productions, including adding "Engine of Love" and "Make Up My Heart", and cutting "No Comeback".

==== The New Starlight Express (1992–2002) ====
In November 1992, the London production was relaunched with significant revisions as The New Starlight Express. Numerous changes from subsequent productions were incorporated:

- Twelve songs were removed: the Overture, "Engine of Love", "Call Me Rusty", "Hitching and Switching", "There's Me", "Belle The Sleeping Car", "Heat Three", "Wide Smile High Style", "No Comeback", "Only He" and "Only You".
- Five songs were added: "Crazy", "He'll Whistle at Me", "Make Up My Heart", "Next Time You Fall in Love", "The Megamix"
- "The Rap" opened the second act and was rewritten entirely to become an anthem to racing.
- The "Entry of National Trains" was moved to the show's opening. "Pumping Iron" was forced to after "AC/DC".
- The characters of Belle and C.B. were cut. This required substantial changes to the plot, as without a clear villain, Rusty, Electra and Greaseball had to cause their problems or be the victims of circumstance to move the story along.
- Rather than winning a heat each, as in the five-race structure, Greaseball and Electra come first and second in the first heat, securing their final place. Rusty did not race until the last, only reluctantly taking Poppa's place after the title song. After the Uphill Final, when Dinah uncouples Electra, with no C.B., he partners Buffy instead for the Downhill Final. At the end of the race, Electra and Greaseball now crashed accidentally, and Electra took C.B.'s place in "One Rock 'n' Roll Too Many".

Starlight Express closed in London on 12 January 2002. Considered one continuous production despite revisions, Starlight Express ran for 7,409 performances, making it the tenth longest-running West End show.

=== Broadway (1987–1989) ===
The Broadway production of Starlight Express began performances on Broadway on 24 February 1987 and opened on 15 March at the Gershwin Theatre. It ran for 761 regular performances and 22 previews, closing on 8 January 1989.

Created by the original team of Trevor Nunn (direction), Arlene Phillips (choreography) and John Napier (design), this version of Starlight Express was extensively revised from the original West End production. The story was localised, with the trains racing across America for a "silver dollar" trophy. The plot was streamlined, with one fewer race than the West End production. Lloyd Webber and Stilgoe also made many changes to the music and lyrics, notably adding a ballad for Pearl, "Make Up My Heart", which has been included in every production since, and a reworked version of "Engine of Love", the novelty pop song Lloyd Webber wrote in 1977 for Earl Jordan. Additional adjustments were made to the characters' costumes, including giving Rusty a "Starlight Express" outfit after "I Am the Starlight", which was deemed too similar to the rolling stock uniforms. This was eventually removed due to a lack of quick-change time and the costume not being different enough.

=== Bochum (1988-present) ===
On 12 June 1988, Starlight Express opened at the purpose-built theatre Starlight Express Theater in Bochum, Germany. The cast recording of the German production featured Lovette George in the role of Pearl. As of 2023, the new reimagined production was still running and has been seen by more than 19 million people. The production took a hiatus only due to the COVID-19 Pandemic, but now continues to run as normal.

The creative team included the choreographer and designer from the West End and Broadway productions, Arlene Phillips and John Napier, alongside a new director, Dion McHugh. Starlight Express in Bochum largely followed the template set by the Broadway production. However, the creative team made further revisions, notably removing a character, Belle, who had been part of both the West End and Broadway productions. At the time of the Bochum production's opening, three markedly different Starlight Express versions ran concurrently. The display changed many times, notably in 2018, to mark the show's 30th anniversary. After extensive workshops in London, songs were cut, characters removed, female engines added, and most notably, Papa changed to Mama. Andrew Lloyd Webber and Arlene Philips felt the current zeitgeist was to make the show more "gender friendly".

The Starlight Express Theater features tracks on three levels in a U-shape, with the audience sitting in the middle and around these tracks. That the venue took less than one year to build is documented in the Guinness Book of Records.

In March 2008, the production ran a talent competition called Musical Showstar 2008 on German television to find the next Rusty and Pearl. Kevin Köhler and Anna-Maria Schmidt won the competition. Schmidt dropped out of training, but Köhler premiered as Rusty on 1 August 2008.

==== Subsequent revisions ====
The production has been updated periodically since 1988, taking in some changes from other worldwide shows:

- In 2003, the songs "Crazy" and "Allein im Licht der Sterne" ("Next Time You Fall in Love") were added to the show, the latter replacing "Du Allein" ("Only You"). A "Megamix" was also added to the end of the show. "Liebesexpress" ("Engine of Love") was shortened. An extra track was added to the set, allowing greater flexibility in staging and more tricks for the skaters.
- In 2006, the Hip Hoppers replaced the Rockies from the second U.S. tour.
- In 2007, the Rap was altered again.
- 2008, the "Entry of the National Trains" was moved to the show's beginning. "There's Me" was cut, and "Engine of Love" was replaced by a shortened version of "Call Me Rusty". "Allein im Licht der Sterne" was cut. Additionally, the title song was reworked to the "When your goodnights have been said" lyric, "He'll Whistle at Me" had lyrics corrected, "The Rap" was changed to "It's Race Time", and the final duet between Rusty and Pearl was updated to the 2007 U.K. tour version of "Only He".
- In 2013, "A Whole Lotta Locomotion" ("Nie Genug") replaced "A Lotta Locomotion". "I Do" (Für Immer), a new song written for the 2012 U.K. and 2013 Asia tour by Lloyd Webber's son Alastair, replaced "Only He". Several songs had lyrics changed and costumes altered with a nod to the original London production.
- In 2017, Krupp, Electra's armaments truck, was cut from the production.

==== 2018 revisions ====
In 2017, Lloyd Webber visited the production for the charity gala in which the show was performed in English and found it 'unrecognisable' following years of incremental revisions. Arlene Phillips added that in 2018, the 'overall tone of the show [now appeared] a little bit sexist'. Lloyd Webber resolved to shut down the production if he could not find a way to 'get Starlight back to its roots'. He wrote new material and workshopped for six performances at The Other Palace in London in September 2017 before being rolled out in Bochum. Phillips directed the stripped-back workshop production with no set, costumes or roller skates. These changes included:

- adding a new song and musical motif for the coaches called "I Got Me" ("Ich Bin Ich"), with lyrics by Lauren Aquilina
- removing several songs that no longer fit the theme
- substantially revising the orchestration in favour of a more rock-based 1980s sound
- reintroducing the Rockies, replacing the Hip Hoppers
- changing the genders of Poppa and Bobo from male to female, becoming 'Momma' and 'Coco'. Rocky 3 became female; Volta became male.
- replacing Ashley and Buffy with Belle, the lounge car, and Tassita, the quiet carriage (in the German production, Tassita would become Carrie, the luggage car, and Belle became a bar car)
- replacing Electra's money truck, Purse, with Killerwatt, the security truck

In May 2018, the Bochum production closed for a month to rehearse the new material and for significant technical updates to the 30-year-old auditorium. Lloyd Webber, Phillips and original designer John Napier returned to oversee the changes, which Lloyd Webber now considers the definitive version of Starlight Express. As well as the changes from The Other Palace, they also:

- updated the German lyrics of several songs within the show
- redesigned many costumes based on new designs
- installed completely new sound and lighting
- introduced the British train named 'Brexit', renamed the Japanese train 'Manga', renamed the French train 'Coco'
- made some characters "gender variable": Rocky 3, Wrench, Volta, and Manga – although primarily meant to be female, female, male, and male respectively – may be played by an actor of a different gender if it's necessary due to vacations/injuries etc. of the original actor, as well as (as of June 2019) Brexit (original meant to be male).

=== Las Vegas (1993–1997) ===
An abridged, 90-minute production without an intermission opened at the Las Vegas Hilton on 14 September 1993, with direction by Arlene Phillips and with Reva Rice reprising her role of Pearl. Several songs were cut, and many lyrics trimmed to make it fit into its 90-minute run time with great care taken to preserve the plot's integrity. This production was the first permanent legitimate musical theatre production in Las Vegas. However, concessions were made through a shortened run time and betting references in the race sequences. The Coaches' costumes were also given a "Vegas Showgirl" makeover during the run. This production used the filmed race sequences from the first U.S. tour (which played in the background during the live races on stage) and some of the set pieces. When the hotel changed ownership, the new owners ended the run before its 5-year contract concluded, with the show closing on 30 November 1997.

=== Mexico City (1997–1998) ===
From October 1997 until April 1998, a Spanish-language production entitled Expreso Astral was played at the Teatro Polanco in Mexico City. Mostly, it was a Spanish version of the Las Vegas production (using the same edited script) with costumes and sets inspired by several earlier shows. The presentation was directed by Bobby Love, with the Spanish translation by Marco Villafan. Many of the character's names were Hispanicized, with Rusty becoming Ferro, Pearl becoming Perla, Poppa becoming El Jefe, and the National Engines were localised with Carioca, a Brazilian train, and Pibe, an Argentine train. A cast recording of this production was made but was never released due to complications with the rights.

=== Wembley (2024–2026) ===
Starlight Express returned to London in summer 2024. The new production, directed by Luke Sheppard began previews at Starlight Auditorium at Troubadour Wembley Park Theatre on 8 June with official opening 30 June 2024. The design team included Tim Hatley (set), Ashley Nottingham (choreography) Andrzej Goulding (video), Gabriella Slade (costumes), and Howard Hudson (lighting). The production introduces Jeevan Braich as Rusty, Kayna Montecillo as Pearl, Jade Marvin as Momma McCoy, Jaydon Vijn as Hydra, Al Knott as Greaseball, Eve Humphrey as Dinah, Tom Pigram as Electra, Renz Cardenas as Tassita and Ashlyn Weekes as Belle.

Greaseball is portrayed as female, Electra uses they/them pronouns, Poppa is changed to Momma and is played by the same actor as plays Control's mother in the first scene. Control is played by a child actor. A script change is that Rusty now wins, with Hydra, by making steam from hydrogen (rather than coal). This is in a new number "Hydrogen" by Lloyd Webber and Stilgoe. A cast recording was released in November 2024.

It had its final performance on the 3rd of May 2026.

=== Touring productions ===
==== North America ====
With a few changes, a downsized version of the Broadway production toured the U.S. and Canada from November 1989 until April 1991. Rather than scaling the show up to fill stadiums, the set was small enough to fit regular regional theatres. The show was the same as the Australian/Japanese touring production, with the "Silver Dollar" subplot removed and the character of Memphis Belle cut completely. With the "Silver Dollar" plot drawn, an abbreviated version of "The Rap" from London was used to open Act II. The races were primarily shown on film; however, a tiny race track extended to the audience. The costumes were based on the original Broadway production, and some were recycled directly from that earlier production.

The second U.S. tour opened in Biloxi, Mississippi on 1 April 2003 and toured the U.S. until 13 June 2004. The show was originally performed featuring the songs "Wide Smile", "Girls' Rolling Stock", and "Only He", but for reasons Troika (the production company) never disclosed, it was later shortened by the removal of "Wide Smile" and "Girls' Rolling Stock" and "Only He" was replaced by "Next Time You Fall In Love". This production featured revisions to the material by David Yazbek, including a new song, "A Whole Lotta Locomotion", and rewriting "The Rap". Due to the restrictions of touring spaces, digital video company Inition was commissioned to produce high-definition race footage in 3D film to replace the live races.

==== Europe ====
The first U.K. tour of Starlight Express (now entitled Starlight Express: The Third Dimension) opened on 4 November 2004 in Manchester. The production was produced by David Ian Productions and directed by Mykal Rand. Originally adapted from the second U.S. tour, most of David Yazbek's contributions were removed after Andrew Lloyd Webber visited a performance. In November 2007 the first U.K. tour production toured Stockholm, Gothenburg, Oslo and Helsinki, using an expanded set designed for use in stadium venues.

Bill Kenwright Productions presented a second tour of the U.K., beginning at the New Wimbledon Theatre on 10 May 2012. This production included a new song, "I Do", written by the composer's son, Alastair Lloyd-Webber in place of "Only You" or "Next Time You Fall in Love". Other changes included the character of Ashley The Smoking Car being replaced by Duvay The Sleeping Car due to the recent British smoking ban, the subsequent redundancy of smoking cars, and the generally negative public attitude toward smoking. The production reused the race sequences filmed for the first U.K. tour.

==== Asia ====
A large-scale "in-the-round" production played in stadiums in Tokyo and Osaka from November 1987 to January 1988. Due to the scale of this production, the National Engines and Electra's Entourage were doubled up to fill the performance area. This production was based on the Broadway production, with only minor changes, such as removing Belle and the "Silver Dollar" subplot. The stage design was unique to this production, featuring landmarks such as Mount Rushmore and a platform that could elevate up from the floor to change the setting of the races. This tour went on to Australia through 1988. Due to popular demand, the in-the-round term returned to Japan from 24 March to 18 July 1990.

2013, the second U.K. tour travelled to Hong Kong, where it played at the Hong Kong Academy for Performing Arts from 11 October to 4 November 2013. From there, it moved to Singapore, playing at the Marina Bay Sands from 13 November to 24 November 2013. This version of the show is licensed for amateur theatre groups as The Definitive Starlight Express.

==== Australia ====
The large-scale tour that began in Japan in 1987 continued to Australia, where it visited Sydney, Brisbane, Melbourne, Adelaide and Perth, ending in May 1988. (Minor characters such as The Components and The Nationals were doubled during this tour and given alternate names to fill the more extensive arena-sized set.)

==== New Zealand ====
In 2009, following an extended run in Europe, the props and costumes from the second U.K. tour were shipped to New Zealand to form a new production. This production played arenas in Wellington, Christchurch and Auckland in July and August 2009 and featured some performers from various other international productions.

=== Non-replica productions ===
==== Starlight Express on Ice (1997) ====
As the first non-replica production of the show, it was completely redesigned by Feld Entertainment 's On Ice unit with the Really Useful Group. It toured the United States from September 1997 until October 1997. The production was directed by Robin Cousins and featured figure- and stunt-skaters miming pre-recorded music. It failed to find an audience and closed halfway through its scheduled tour.

==== Johannesburg, South Africa (2013) ====
The South African premiere occurred at the Joburg Theatre from 2 July until 1 September 2013. The production was directed by Janice Honeyman with choreography by Karen Bruce, who was given carte blanche to reimagine the show.

==== Regional and amateur licensed productions ====
The show is available to regional and school groups in the U.S.A. The regional premiere was in Tuacahn, Utah, in June 2013. It is licensed through Concord Theatricals.

== Cast ==
| Characters | Original West End cast (1984) | Original Broadway cast (1987) | Original Australian/Japanese Cast (1987) | Original Bochum cast (1988) | First US Tour cast (1989) | Second Japanese condition (1990) | Original Las Vegas cast (1993) | Second US Tour cast (2003) | Original UK Tour cast (2004) | Original New Zealand cast (2009) | UK Tour Cast (2012) | Bochum 30th Anniversary cast (2018) | London Revival cast (2024) |
|---|---|---|---|---|---|---|---|---|---|---|---|---|---|
| Rusty | Ray Shell | Greg Mowry | Bobby Collins | Steven Michael Skeels | Sean McDermott | Bobby Collins | Steven Michael Skeels | Franklyn Warfield | James Gillan | Jamie Golding | Kristofer Harding | Blake Patrick Anderson | Jeevan Braich |
| Pearl | Stephanie Lawrence | Reva Rice | Nikki Belsher | Maria Jane Hyde | Reva Rice | Nikki Belsher | Reva Rice | Clarissa Grace | Jane Horn | Rebecca Wright | Amanda Coutts | Georgina Hagen | Kayna Montecillo |
| Greaseball | Jeff Shankley | Robert Torti | Troy Burgess | Paul Kribbe | Ron DeVito | Danny Metcalfe | Rod Weber | Drue Williams | Tom Kanavan | Matthew Cutts | Jamie Capewell | Ben Carruthers | Al Knott |
| Electra | Jeffrey Daniel, Tom Jobe | Kenneth Ard | David-Michael Johnson | Eric Clausell | Eric Clausell | Mykal Rand | Anthony T. Perry | Dustin Dubreuil | Mykal Rand | Mykal Rand | Mykal Rand | Sjoerd van der Meer | Tom Pigram |
| Dinah the Dining Car | Frances Ruffelle | Jane Krakowski | Debbie Wake | Natalie Howard | Dawn Marie Church | Debbie Wake | Dawn Marie Church | Katie O'Toole | Tanya Robb | Torum Heng | Ruthie Stephens | Rose Ouellette | Eve Humphrey |
| Buffy the Buffet Car | Nancy Wood | Jamie Beth Chandler | Charlotte Avery | Carol Hoffman | Nicole Picard | Caron Cardelle | Edyie Fleming | Joanna Richert | Ashley Hale | Camilla Hardy | Camilla Hardy | Veronika Hammer (as Carrie the Luggage Van) | Renz Cardenas (as Tassita the Quiet Car) |
| Ashley the Smoking Car (From 2018 Belle) | Chrissy Wickham | Andrea McArdle | Erin Lordan | Roslyn Howell | Rachelle Rak | C. J. Ranger | Meera Popkin | Kait Holbrook | Tanya Robb | Sarah Landy | Kelsey Cobban (as Duvay the Sleeping Car) | Rochelle Sherona (as Belle the Bar Car) | Ashlyn Weekes (as Belle the Sleeping Car) |
| Poppa (From 2018 Momma) | Lon Satton | Steve Fowler | Richie Pitts | Trevor Michael Georges | Jimmy Lockett | Richie Pitts | Jimmy Lockett | Dennis LeGree | Anton Stephens | Lothair Eaton | Lothair Eaton | Reva Rice | Jade Marvin |
| Dustin | Gary Love | Michael Scott Gregory | Geoffrey Stevens | Garry Noakes | | | | | | | | Daniel Holley | Jaydon Vijn (as Hydra) |

== Awards and nominations ==
Original London production

| Year | Award | Category | Nominee | Result |
|---|---|---|---|---|
| 1984 | Laurence Olivier Award | Best New Musical | | Nominated |
| 1984 | Laurence Olivier Award | Best Actor in a Musical | Lon Satton | Nominated |

Original Broadway production

| Year | Award | Category | Nominee | Result |
|---|---|---|---|---|
| 1987 | Tony Award | Best Musical | | Nominated |
| 1987 | Tony Award | Best Original Score | Andrew Lloyd Webber and Richard Stilgoe | Nominated |
| 1987 | Tony Award | Best Performance by a Featured Actor in a Musical | Robert Torti | Nominated |
| 1987 | Tony Award | Best Direction of a Musical | Trevor Nunn | Nominated |
| 1987 | Tony Award | Best Choreography | Arlene Phillips | Nominated |
| 1987 | Tony Award | Best Costume Design | John Napier | Won |
| 1987 | Tony Award | Best Lighting Design | David Hersey | Nominated |
| 1987 | Drama Desk Award | Outstanding Musical | | Nominated |
| 1987 | Drama Desk Award | Outstanding Music | Andrew Lloyd Webber | Nominated |
| 1987 | Drama Desk Award | Outstanding Set Design | John Napier | Won |
| 1987 | Drama Desk Award | Outstanding Costume Design | John Napier | Won |

Wembley/London Revival (2024)

| Year | Award | Category | Nominee | Result |
|---|---|---|---|---|
| 2024 | The Stage Debut Awards | Best Performer in a Musical | Jeevan Braich | Won |
| 2025 | WhatsOnStage Awards | Best Professional Debut Performance | Jeevan Braich | Won |
| 2025 | WhatsOnStage Awards | Best Supporting Performer in a Musical | Jaydon Vijn | Nominated |
| 2025 | WhatsOnStage Awards | Best Musical Revival | Starlight Express, Troubadour Wembley Park Theatre | Won |
| 2025 | WhatsOnStage Awards | Best Costume Design | Gabriella Slade | Won |
| 2025 | WhatsOnStage Awards | Best Lighting Design | Howard Hudson | Won |
| 2025 | WhatsOnStage Awards | Best Set Design | Tim Hatley | Won |
| 2025 | WhatsOnStage Awards | Best Sound Design | Gareth Owen | Nominated |
| 2025 | WhatsOnStage Awards | Best Video Design | Andrzej Goulding | Won |
| 2025 | WhatsOnStage Awards | Best Wigs, Hair and Make Up Design | Jackie Saundercock and Campbell Young Associates | Won |
| 2025 | London For Groups Awards | Best West End Musical | Starlight Express, Troubadour Wembley Park Theatre | Won |
| 2025 | Laurence Olivier Awards | Best Musical Revival | Starlight Express, Troubadour Wembley Park Theatre | Nominated |
| 2025 | Laurence Olivier Awards | Best Costume Design | Gabriella Slade | Won |
| 2025 | Laurence Olivier Awards | Best Lighting Design | Howard Hudson | Nominated |

== Recordings ==
Cast Recordings

- 1984 Original London Cast Recording
- 1987 US Concept Album: Music and Songs From Starlight Express
- 1987 Japan/Australia Tour Highlights Album
- 1988 German Original Cast Recording
- 1989 German Complete Live Recording
- 1991 German Highlights Album
- 1992 New London Cast Recording
- 2013 German Complete Cast Recording
- 2024 West End Revival Cast Recording

=== Charts ===
| Chart (1988) | Peak position |
|---|---|
| Australia (Kent Music Report) | 61 |

Singles

- Engine of Love/Steaming (1977)
- I am the Starlight/Starlight Express (1984)
- AC/DC/The C.B. Side (1984)
- Only You/Rolling Stock (1984)
- Only He (Has the Power to Move Me)/Engine Race (1984)
- The Race is On (Harold Faltermeyer)/The Race is On (Radio Edit)/The Race is On (Instrumental)/The Race is On (Dub Version) (1987)
- Er Allein/Ich Bin Wie Ich Bin – Angelika Milster (1988)
- The Train (Note: a multilingual (Japanese/English) cover of the song of the same name by the band 1910 Fruitgum Company.)/Girls' Rolling Stock (1990)
- Only You (1992)
- Next Time You Fall in Love/Make Up My Heart/Mega Mix (1993)
- Crazy/Starlight Express/Allein Im Licht der Sterne/Mega Mix/Starlight Express (Boy Band Version) (2003)
- Ich bin Ich/I Am Me/I Am Me (DJ Dagadisco Remix) (2023)
- Hydrogen/Crazy (2024)
