= Starlight Express (song) =

Popular musical song

Song by Ray Shell

from the album Starlight Express
- Released: July 28, 1984
- Genre: Show tune
- Length: 3:07
- Label: Polydor
- Composer: Andrew Lloyd Webber
- Lyricist: Richard Stilgoe
- Producer: Andrew Lloyd Webber

"Starlight Express" is the 'showstopper' number from the musical Starlight Express. In the show, it is performed by Rusty, the show's protagonist. Before the song, he has been told by the old steam engine Poppa of a magical locomotive, named the Starlight Express, who will aid him in need.

The song has been rewritten in many languages, but it has always kept the same title, apart from when the production opened in Mexico, when both the show and the song were renamed Expreso Astral.

== Music and lyrics ==
The music was written by Andrew Lloyd Webber, in the key of E flat major, modulating to E major at the instrumental. In the Broadway production, Greg Mowry sings the song in the key of G major and modulates to Ab. The lyrics were written by Richard Stilgoe.

Starlight Express, Starlight Express
Are you real? Yes or no?
Starlight Express, Answer me yes!
I don't want you to go

Before the song starts, Poppa and Rusty have the following (sung) conversation;

Poppa: That's my boy, I knew you's believe.
Rusty: Poppa, I have to believe. [Poppa Exits] I have no choice...
Rusty: (Broadway) Poppa, I don't know if I believe. But I'll try, I have to try.

The song begins, and the introduction is the main theme played on a harmonica, and this is repeated for the instrumental.

=== Revision ===
The song has undergone some revision since the show was premiered in London. The first draft started with the line

When your goodnights have been said and you are lying in bed'

However, the verses were rewritten when the show opened on Broadway, in Germany, Japan and Australia. To fit the new tune, new words were written, starting with:

When the night is darkest, open up your mind

A new middle eight was added as well.

When the show was revised in London, both drafts were fused together, with the verses from London and the middle eight from later productions. This draft has become the most popular and well-used.

The original London tune has been revived for the revised Bochum production.

=== Thematic value ===
The tune to the chorus is used throughout the show, for instance, when Rusty first hears of the Starlight Express; during the 'Starlight Sequence'; and when Rusty triumphs over his challengers (see main article). It is probably meant to show a point where there is a strong development in Rusty's character.

== Starlight Express Introduction ==
The Starlight Express Introduction was performed on Broadway and in London by Poppa and Belle. In later revisions, it is performed only by Poppa and has been shortened significantly. The number uses the first verse and chorus tunes from the London Production, and is used for the moment when Rusty first hears of the Starlight Express. In the first Bochum version this part was sung by Poppa and Control.

Starlight Express hears your distress
He's there, all around
Starlight Express will answer you "yes"
He's waiting to be found!

== Recordings ==
All versions of the song can be found on the following recordings;

- Starlight Express: Original London Cast Recording - performed by Ray Shell - (1984)
- Starlight Express: Broadway Highlights Recording - performed by El DeBarge - (1987)
- Starlight Express: Australian Cast Recording - performed by Bobby Collins - (1987)
- Starlight Express: German Cast Recording (Concept Album) - performed by Steven Michael Skeels - (1988)
- Starlight Express: Original German Live Album Recording - performed by Bernie Blanks - (1989)
- Starlight Express: Further German Cast Recording - performed by Colin Munro - (1991)
- The New Starlight Express - performed by Greg Ellis - (1993)
- Expreso Astral: Mexican Cast Recording - performed by Ricardo Santo - (1997) (This recording was made but never released.)
- Starlight Express: New Songs - performed by Jamie Golding - (2003)
- "Starlight Express" (2024) – single by Sydnie Christmas

== Notable performances ==
- Greg Mowry
- Ray Shell
- El DeBarge
- Greg Ellis
- James Gillan
- Kevin Köhler
- Dame Shirley Bassey
