= Richard Stilgoe =

British songwriter, lyricist and musician

Sir Richard Stilgoe OBE DL
- Born: Richard Henry Simpson Stilgoe; 28 March 1943 (age 83); Camberley, Surrey, England
- Genre: Musical theatre
- Occupations: Songwriter; Lyricist; Musician; Broadcaster
- Years active: 1966–present
- Website: richardstilgoe.com

Sir Richard Henry Simpson Stilgoe OBE DL (born 28 March 1943) is a British songwriter, lyricist and musician, and broadcaster who is best known for his humorous songs and frequent television appearances. His output includes collaborations with Andrew Lloyd Webber and Peter Skellern. He is also a keen puzzler who has hosted several quiz shows and written several books on the subject.

In the 1980s, Stilgoe founded the Alchemy Foundation which is funded from his royalties from the American productions of Starlight Express and The Phantom of the Opera. He is patron of the Surrey Care Trust in Woking. In the late 1990s he founded the Orpheus Centre which offers performing arts experiences to young people with disabilities. In 2012, Stilgoe was knighted in the Queen's Birthday Honours for his extensive charity work.

== Early life ==
Stilgoe was born in Camberley, Surrey, on 28 March 1943. He was brought up in Liverpool, where, as lead singer of a group called 'Tony Snow and the Blizzards', he performed at the Cavern Club. He was educated at Liverpool College, Monkton Combe School in Somerset and at Clare College, Cambridge, where he was a member of the Cambridge University Footlights.

== Career ==
In 1966, Stilgoe played Benjamin in the West End musical, Jorrocks. He made his name on the BBC television teatime programme, Nationwide, followed by Esther Rantzen's That's Life!, a light-hearted consumer affairs programme for which he wrote comic songs satirising minor domestic misfortunes, often to the tune of "Oh! Mr Porter". One notable song concerned officials who have "Statutory Right of Entry to your Home", with Stilgoe playing and singing, in barber-shop style, all parts himself using trick photography.

His ability to write a song from almost any source material and at speed is part of his cabaret act, which includes singing the instructions from a Swedish payphone; a pastiche of the King's Singers listing the kings and queens of England in which he sings all four parts; and composing a song in the interval from words and musical notes called out by the audience. He has also written and presented BBC radio programmes, including Hamburger Weekend, Used Notes, Stilgoe's Around, Maestro and Richard Stilgoe's Traffic Jam Show on BBC Radio 4.

In 1979, the BBC aired "Decision '79 Breakfast Special" as part of its coverage of the parliamentary elections that brought Margaret Thatcher to power; the show featured Stilgoe singing the election results. In 1981, Southern Television commissioned him to write a satirical song about the company that outbid them for southern England's ITV franchise, Television South; the result was "Portakabin TV", a reference to the portable buildings TVS was forced to use as studios and offices until its own purpose-built complex in Maidstone, Kent could be completed and until Southern's contract expired. The song was aired as part of Southern's final broadcast on 31 December 1981, a retrospective programme titled And It's Goodbye From Us, with a fragment heard in Day By Yesterday.

In 1980, he wrote two Christmas songs, "Christmas Bells" and "Imitation Myrrh", which he sang with Broom Leys Junior School choir, from Coalville, Leicestershire. The songs were sold as a record at Christmas throughout Leicestershire to raise money for the Leicestershire Arts and Music Association. These two, with other Christmas pieces of his composition, also appeared in The Truth about Christmas – or Gold, Frankenstein and Merv – a one-off television programme in 1984, performed by Stilgoe and children from the Broom Leys Junior School Choir.

Stilgoe is a fan of anagrams and in 1980 he wrote The Richard Stilgoe Letters; a Jumble of Anagrams, using characters made of anagrams of his own name. These included Chris Dogtailer and Giscard O'Hitler. He has appeared over 200 times on the daytime TV quiz show, Countdown, and hosted quiz shows such as The Year in Question on Radio 4, Finders Keepers (1981–1985), and Scoop (1981–1982). His 45-minute poem, "Who Pays the Piper?", outlined the history of music from Pan to the modern day, interspersing classical music with re-written lyrics. He also appeared on a satirical BBC TV show of the 1980s, A Kick Up the Eighties.

Stilgoe wrote lyrics for Andrew Lloyd Webber's Cats and Starlight Express, and collaborated with Charles Hart on the lyrics to The Phantom of the Opera. He also wrote two musicals for schools, Bodywork and Brilliant the Dinosaur. He has appeared on the Royal Variety Performance, presented the Schools Proms for over 20 years and toured solo and with Peter Skellern.

Throughout the 1980s, Stilgoe hosted the BBC 2 fitness programme Looking Good, Feeling Fit.

== Charitable work ==
In 1984, Stilgoe founded the Alchemy Foundation, which distributes money to good causes. The foundation is funded from Stilgoe's royalties from American productions of Starlight Express and The Phantom of the Opera. Before The Alchemy Foundation, Stilgoe gave all his royalties as lyricist on Starlight Express to a village in India. Such was the musical's success that for some years these were exceeding £500 a day.

Stilgoe founded the Orpheus Centre in 1998, in his former family home in Godstone, Surrey, offering performing arts experiences to young people with disabilities; he also started the Stilgoe Family Concerts series at the Royal Festival Hall, which feature young performers and regular commissions of new music.

He is President of the Surrey Care Trust in Woking, Surrey, which provides education, training, skills and volunteering opportunities to those who need motivation or a second chance in life. The charity also runs a fund to help those facing hardship throughout Surrey.

== Personal life ==
Stilgoe has five children: a son and daughter with his first wife Lizzie, and two sons and a daughter with his second wife, Annabel, including musician Joe Stilgoe.

Stilgoe was High Sheriff of Surrey in 1998–99, and is a Deputy Lieutenant. He became president of Surrey County Cricket Club in 2005. He has also been president of the Lord's Taverners.

Stilgoe owns Winifred Atwell's "other" piano, the one which she used for her honky-tonk performances and recordings.

== Awards and honours ==
Stilgoe has two Tony nominations, three Monte Carlo Prizes, and a Prix Italia. He has honorary doctorates from the Universities of Greenwich, Southampton and Surrey, is an honorary Fellow of Liverpool John Moores University, an honorary Associate of the Royal Academy of Music, and an Honorary Member of the Royal College of Music. He was appointed an Officer of the Order of the British Empire (OBE) in the 1998 Birthday Honours, "for services to the community, especially Disabled People."

Stilgoe was knighted in the 2012 Birthday Honours for charitable services through the Alchemy Foundation.
