= List of Tony and Olivier Award–winning plays =

The following is a list of plays that have won the Tony Award or Laurence Olivier Award for Best Play. Highlighted shows are currently running on either Broadway or West End as of June 2026.

Title	Year	Writer(s)	Tony	Olivier	Notes
All the Way	2012	Robert Schenkkan	2014		Won both Tony Awards for which it was nominated.
Amadeus	1979	Peter Shaffer	1981		Nominated for seven Tony Awards, winning five.
Angels in America: Millennium Approaches	1991	Tony Kushner	1993		Nominated for nine Tony Awards, winning four.
Angels in America: Perestroika	1992	Tony Kushner	1994		Nominated for six Tony Awards, winning three.
Another Country	1982	Julian Mitchell		1982	
Arcadia	1994	Tom Stoppard		1994	
'Art'	1994	Yasmina Reza	1998		Nominated for three Tony Awards, winning one.
August: Osage County	2007	Tracy Letts	2008		Nominated for seven Tony Awards, winning five.
Becket	1959	Jean Anouilh	1961		Nominated for five Tony Awards, winning four.
Benefactors	1984	Michael Frayn		1984	
Betrayal	1979	Harold Pinter		1979	
Biloxi Blues	1984	Neil Simon	1985		Won all three Tony Awards for which it was nominated.
Black Watch	2009	Gregory Burke		2009	
Blackbird	2007	David Harrower		2007	
Blue/Orange	2001	Joe Penhall		2001	
Borstal Boy	1967	Frank McMahon	1970		Nominated for three Tony Awards, winning one.
Broken Glass	1995	Arthur Miller		1995	
Children of a Lesser God	1980	Mark Medoff	1980	1981	Nominated for four Tony Awards, winning three.
Chimerica	2013	Lucy Kirkwood		2014	
Closer	1998	Patrick Marber		1998	
Clybourne Park	2010	Bruce Norris	2012	2011	Nominated for four Tony Awards, winning one.
The Coast of Utopia	2002	Tom Stoppard	2007		Nominated for ten Tony Awards, winning seven.
The Cocktail Party	1949	T. S. Eliot	1950		Won one Tony Award for which it was nominated.
Collaborators	2012	John Hodge		2012	
Copenhagen	1998	Michael Frayn	2000		Won all three Tony Awards for which it was nominated.
The Crucible	1953	Arthur Miller	1953		Won both Tony Awards for which it was nominated.
The Curious Incident of the Dog in the Night-Time	2013	Simon Stephens	2015	2013	Nominated for six Tony Awards, winning five.
Da	1978	Hugh Leonard	1978		Won all four Tony Awards for which it was nominated.
Dancing at Lughnasa	1990	Brian Friel	1992	1991	Nominated for eight Tony Awards, winning three.
Dear Daddy	1976	Denis Cannan		1976	
Dear England	2023	James Graham		2024	
Death and the Maiden	1992	Ariel Dorfman		1992	
Death of a Salesman	1949	Arthur Miller	1949		Won all six Tony Awards for which it was nominated.
The Desperate Hours	1955	Joseph Hayes	1955		Won both Tony Awards for which it was nominated.
The Diary of Anne Frank	1955	Frances Goodrich and Albert Hackett	1956		Nominated for five Tony Awards, winning one.
A Disappearing Number	2008	Simon McBurney		2008	
Doubt	2004	John Patrick Shanley	2005		Nominated for eight Tony Awards, winning four.
The Elephant Man	1979	Bernard Pomerance	1979		Nominated for seven Tony Awards, winning three.
Equus	1973	Peter Shaffer	1975		Nominated for five Tony Awards, winning two.
Fences	1983	August Wilson	1987		Nominated for six Tony Awards, winning four.
The Ferryman	2017	Jez Butterworth	2019	2018	Nominated for nine Tony Awards, winning four.
The Fire that Consumes	1977	Henry de Montherlant, Vivian Cox and Bernard Miles		1977	
The Fourposter	1951	Jan de Hartog	1952		Won both Tony Awards for which it was nominated.
Giant	2024	Mark Rosenblatt		2025	
Glengarry Glen Ross	1983	David Mamet		1983	
The Goat, or Who Is Sylvia?	2002	Edward Albee	2002		Nominated for two Tony Awards, winning one.
God of Carnage	2006	Yasmina Reza	2009		Nominated for six Tony Awards, winning three.
Goodnight Children Everywhere	2000	Richard Nelson		2000	
The Grapes of Wrath	1988	Frank Galati	1990		Nominated for eight Tony Awards, winning two.
The Great White Hope	1967	Howard Sackler	1969		Won all three Tony Awards for which it was nominated.
Hangmen	2015	Martin McDonagh		2016	
Harry Potter and the Cursed Child	2016	J. K. Rowling, Jack Thorne and John Tiffany	2018	2017	Nominated for ten Tony Awards, winning six.
The Heidi Chronicles	1988	Wendy Wasserstein	1989		Nominated for six Tony Awards, winning two.
The History Boys	2004	Alan Bennett	2006	2005	Nominated for seven Tony Awards, winning six.
The Homecoming	1965	Harold Pinter	1967		Nominated for six Tony Awards, winning four.
The Humans	2014	Stephen Karam	2016		Nominated for six Tony Awards, winning four.
I Am My Own Wife	2003	Doug Wright	2004		Nominated for three Tony Awards, winning two.
I'm Not Rappaport	1984	Herb Gardner	1986		Won all three Tony Awards for which it was nominated.
The Inheritance	2018	Matthew Lopez	2020	2019	Nominated for eleven Tony Awards, winning four.
J.B.	1958	Archibald MacLeish	1959		Nominated for five Tony Awards, winning two.
Jitney	2002	August Wilson		2002	
King Charles III	2014	Mike Bartlett		2015	
The Last Night of Ballyhoo	1996	Alfred Uhry	1997		Nominated for four Tony Awards, winning one.
The Lehman Trilogy	2013	Stefano Massini and Ben Power	2022		Nominated for eight Tony Awards, winning five.
Leopoldstadt	2020	Tom Stoppard	2023	2020	Nominated for six Tony Awards, winning four.
Les liaisons dangereuses	1986	Christopher Hampton		1986	
Liberation	2025	Bess Wohl	2026		Nominated for five Tony Awards, winning one.
The Life and Adventures of Nicholas Nickleby	1980	David Edgar	1982	1980	Nominated for nine Tony Awards, winning five.
Life of Pi	2019	Lolita Chakrabarti		2022	
Long Day's Journey into Night	1956	Eugene O'Neill	1957		Nominated for six Tony Awards, winning two.
Lost in Yonkers	1990	Neil Simon	1991		Nominated for five Tony Awards, winning four.
Love! Valour! Compassion!	1994	Terrence McNally	1995		Nominated for five Tony Awards, winning two.
Luther	1961	John Osborne	1964		Nominated for two Tony Awards, winning one.
M. Butterfly	1988	David Henry Hwang	1988		Nominated for seven Tony Awards, winning three.
A Man for All Seasons	1960	Robert Bolt	1962		Won all five Tony Awards for which it was nominated.
Marat/Sade	1965	Peter Weiss	1966		Nominated for five Tony Awards, winning four.
Master Class	1995	Terrence McNally	1996		Won all three Tony Awards for which it was nominated.
The Miracle Worker	1959	William Gibson	1960		Nominated for five Tony Awards, winning four.
Mister Roberts	1948	Thomas Heggen and Joshua Logan	1948		Won all six Tony Awards for which it was nominated.
The Mountaintop	2010	Katori Hall		2010	
On the Shore of the Wide World	2006	Simon Stephens		2006	
Oslo	2016	J. T. Rogers	2017		Nominated for seven Tony Awards, winning two.
Our Country's Good	1988	Timberlake Wertenbaker		1988	
The Pillowman	2004	Martin McDonagh		2004	
Prima Facie	2019	Suzie Miller		2023	
Proof	2000	David Auburn	2001		Nominated for six Tony Awards, winning three.
Punch	2024	James Graham		2026	
Purpose	2024	Branden Jacobs-Jenkins	2025		Nominated for six Tony Awards, winning two.
Racing Demon	1990	David Hare		1990	
The Real Thing	1982	Tom Stoppard	1984		Nominated for seven Tony Awards, winning five.
Red	2009	John Logan	2010		Nominated for seven Tony Awards, winning six.
Red Noses	1985	Peter Barnes		1985	
The River Niger	1972	Joseph A. Walker	1974		Nominated for three Tony Awards, winning one.
The Rose Tattoo	1951	Tennessee Williams	1951		Won all four Tony Awards for which it was nominated.
Rosencrantz and Guildenstern Are Dead	1966	Tom Stoppard	1968		Nominated for eight Tony Awards, winning four.
Serious Money	1987	Caryl Churchill		1987	
The Shadow Box	1977	Michael Cristofer	1977		Nominated for five Tony Awards, winning two.
Side Man	1998	Warren Leight	1999		Won both Tony Awards for which it was nominated.
Six Degrees of Separation	1993	John Guare		1993	
Skylight	1996	David Hare		1996	
Sleuth	1970	Anthony Shaffer	1971		Nominated for three Tony Awards, winning one.
Stanley	1997	Pam Gems		1997	
Stereophonic	2023	David Adjmi	2024		Nominated for thirteen Tony Awards, winning five.
Sticks and Bones	1971	David Rabe	1972		Nominated for four Tony Awards, winning two.
The Subject Was Roses	1964	Frank D. Gilroy	1965		Nominated for five Tony Awards, winning two.
Sunrise at Campobello	1958	Dore Schary	1958		Nominated for five Tony Awards, winning four.
Take Me Out	2002	Richard Greenberg	2003		Nominated for four Tony Awards, winning three.
The Teahouse of the August Moon	1953	John Patrick	1954		Won all three Tony Awards for which it was nominated.
That Championship Season	1972	Jason Miller	1973		Nominated for five Tony Awards, winning two.
Torch Song Trilogy	1982	Harvey Fierstein	1983		Won both Tony Awards for which it was nominated.
Travesties	1974	Tom Stoppard	1976		Nominated for three Tony Awards, winning two.
Vanya and Sonia and Masha and Spike	2012	Christopher Durang	2013		Nominated for six Tony Awards, winning one.
Vincent in Brixton	2003	Nicholas Wright		2003	
War Horse	2007	Nick Stafford	2011		Won all six Tony Awards for which it was nominated.
The Weir	1999	Conor McPherson		1999	
Who's Afraid of Virginia Woolf?	1962	Edward Albee	1963		Nominated for six Tony Awards, winning five.
Whose Life Is It Anyway?	1978	Brian Clark		1978	

== See also ==
- List of Tony and Olivier Award–winning musicals
