= Laurence Olivier Award for Best Performance in a Musical =

Retired award for London theatre

- Awarded for: Best Performance in a Musical
- Location: England
- Presented by: Society of London Theatre
- First award: 1977
- Final award: 1978
- Website: officiallondontheatre.com/olivier-awards/

The Laurence Olivier Award for Best Performance in a Musical was an annual award presented by the Society of London Theatre in recognition of the "world-class status of London theatre." The awards were established as the Society of West End Theatre Awards in 1976, and renamed in 1984 in honour of English actor and director Laurence Olivier.

This commingled actor/actress award was introduced in 1977, was also presented in 1978, then in 1979 was replaced by newly created awards for Best Actress in a Musical and Best Actor in a Musical.

On the two occasions that this commingled award was given, it was presented to an actress.

== Award winners ==
=== 1970s ===
Year	Performer	Musical	Character
1977
1977	Anna Sharkey	Maggie	Maggie Wylie
1977	Charles Augins	Bubbling Brown Sugar	Performer
1977	Helen Glezer	Bubbling Brown Sugar	Performer
1977	Wayne Sleep	The Point!	Oblio
1978
1978	Elaine Paige	Evita	Eva Perón
1978	David Essex	Evita	Che
1978	Roy Hudd	Oliver!	Fagin
1978	Stratford Johns	Annie	Oliver Warbucks
