= Laurence Olivier Award for Best Actor in a Supporting Role =

Annual award for London theatre

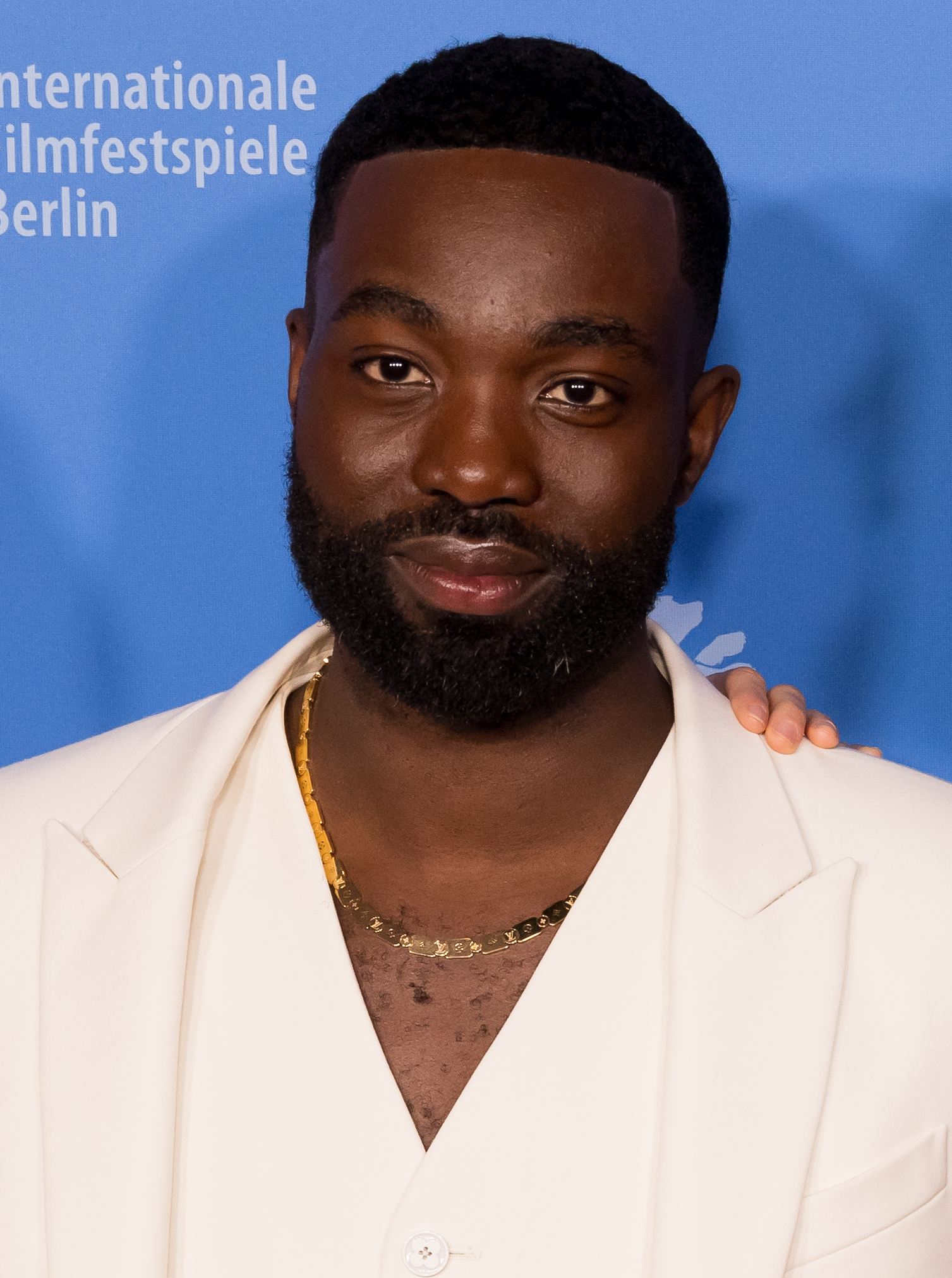
- 2026 Recipient: Paapa Essiedu
- Awarded for: Best Actor in a Supporting Role
- Location: England
- Presented by: Society of London Theatre
- First award: 1977
- Currently held by: Paapa Essiedu for All My Sons (2026)
- Website: officiallondontheatre.com/olivier-awards/

The Laurence Olivier Award for Best Actor in a Supporting Role is an annual award presented by the Society of London Theatre in recognition of the "world-class status of London theatre." The Oliviers were established as the Society of West End Theatre Awards in 1976, and renamed in 1984 in honour of English actor and director Laurence Olivier.

This award was first given in 1977, then was replaced in 1985 by the commingled actor/actress Best Performance in a Supporting Role, which replaced the 1977 to 1984 pair of Best Actor in a Supporting Role and Best Actress in a Supporting Role awards. From 1991 to 2012, the general supporting category vacillated at random between the commingled singular award (presented for 12 different seasons) and the pair of awards (presented for the other 11 seasons); the commingled award was last given in 2012, and the split pair of Best Actor and Best Actress awards have been presented every year since.

== Winners and nominees ==
=== 1970s ===
Year	Actor	Play	Character
1977
1977	Nigel Hawthorne	Privates on Parade	Major Giles Flack
1977	Michael Pennington	Romeo and Juliet	Mercutio
1977	Paul Rogers	The Madras House	Henry Huxtable
1977	Patrick Ryecart	Candida	Eugene Marchbanks
1978
1978	Robert Eddison	Twelfth Night	Andrew Aguecheek / Feste
1978	Michael Bryant	The Double Dealer	Sir Paul Plyant
1978	Julian Glover	Coriolanus	Aufidius
1978	Robert Stephens	Brand	Mayor
1979
1979	Patrick Stewart	Antony and Cleopatra	Enobarbus
1979	Michael Bryant	Undiscovered Country	Dr. von Aigner
1979	Stephen Greif	Death of a Salesman	Biff
1979	David Suchet	Once in a Lifetime	Herman Glogauer

=== 1980s ===
Year	Actor	Play	Character
1980
1980	David Threlfall	Nicholas Nickleby	Angry Gentleman / Smike
1980	Simon Callow	Amadeus	Wolfgang Amadeus Mozart
1980	Edward Petherbridge	Nicholas Nickleby	Newman Noggs
1980	John Rogan	Juno and the Paycock	Joxer Daly
1981
1981	Joe Melia	Good	Maurice
1981	Tony Church	Hamlet	Polonius
1981	Norman Rodway	Shadow of a Gunman	Seuman Shields
1981	Tom Wilkinson	Hamlet	Horatio
1982
1982	David Healy	Guys and Dolls	Nicely Nicely Johnson
1982	Geoffrey Hutchings	A Midsummer Night's Dream	Bottom
1982	Stephen Moore	All's Well That Ends Well	Parolles
1982	Paul Rogers	The Importance of Being Earnest	Rev. Canon Chasuble
1983
1983	Alan Devlin	A Moon for the Misbegotten	Phil Hogan
1983	Ian McDiarmid	Tales from Hollywood	Bertolt Brecht
1983	Mark Rylance	Arden of Faversham	Michael
1983	Antony Sher	King Lear	Fool
1984
1984	Edward Petherbridge	Strange Interlude	Charles Marsden
1984	Ramolao Makhene	"Master Harold"...and the Boys	Sam
1984	Richard O'Callaghan	Twelfth Night	Feste
1984	Timothy Spall	Saint Joan	Charles, the Dauphin

=== 1990s ===
Year	Actor	Play	Character
1991
1991	David Bradley	King Lear	The Fool
1991	Ben Daniels	Never the Sinner	Richard Loeb
1991	Mick Ford	Singer	Stefan
1991	Jonathan Kent	The Rehearsal	Hero
1992
1992	Oleg Menshikov	When She Danced	Sergei Yesenin
1992	Simon Russell Beale	Troilus and Cressida	Thersites
1992	Henry Goodman	Angels in America	Roy Cohn / Prior 2
1992	Ken Stott	The Recruiting Officer	Sergeant Kite
1993
1993	Julian Glover	Henry IV, Parts 1 and 2	Henry IV of England
1993	Robin Bailey	Trelawny of the Wells	Sir William Gower
1993	David Bradley	Henry IV, Part 2	Justice Shallow
1993	Martin Shaw	An Ideal Husband	Lord Goring
1994
1994	Joseph Mydell	Angels in America: Perestroika	Belize
1994	Richard McCabe	The Winter's Tale	Autolycus
1994	Rufus Sewell	Arcadia	Septimus Hodge
1995
1995	Ken Stott	Broken Glass	Dr. Harry Hyman
1995	Simon Russell Beale	The Tempest	Ariel
1995	Simon Coates	As You Like It	Celia
1995	Trevor Peacock	The Birthday Party	Petey
1997
1997	Trevor Eve	Uncle Vanya	Astrov
1997	Stephen Boxer	The Herbal Bed	Barnabus Goche
1997	Tony Haygarth	Twelve Angry Men	Juror 3
1997	Owen Teale	A Doll's House	Torvald Helmer

=== 2000s ===
Year	Actor	Play	Character
2000
2000	Roger Allam	Money	Henry Graves
2000	Michael Bryant	Summerfolk	Semyon Dvoetochie
2000	Ron Cook	Juno and the Paycock	Joxer Daly
2000	Michael Williams	The Forest	Arkadiy Schastlivtsev
2001
2001	Ben Daniels	All My Sons	Chris Keller
2001	Chiwetel Ejiofor	Blue/Orange	Christopher
2001	Douglas Hodge	The Caretaker	Aston
2001	Jason Watkins	A Servant to Two Masters	Truffaldino
2002
2002	Toby Jones	The Play What I Wrote	Arthur
2002	Desmond Barrit	Henry IV, Parts 1 and 2	Sir John Falstaff
2002	Ned Beatty	Cat on a Hot Tin Roof	Big Daddy
2002	Adam Godley	Mouth to Mouth	Gompertz
2002	Malcolm Sinclair	Privates on Parade	Major Giles Flack

=== 2010s ===
Year	Actor	Play	Character
2010
2010	Eddie Redmayne	Red	Ken
2010	Mackenzie Crook	Jerusalem	Ginger
2010	Rory Kinnear	Burnt by the Sun	Mitya
2010	Tim Pigott-Smith	ENRON	Ken Lay
2011
2011	Adrian Scarborough	After the Dance	John Reid
2011	James Laurenson	Hamlet	Ghost / The Player King
2011	Hilton McRae	End of the Rainbow	Anthony
2011	Lee Ross	Birdsong	Jack Firebrace
2013
2013	Richard McCabe	The Audience	Harold Wilson
2013	Paul Chahidi	Twelfth Night	Maria
2013	Adrian Scarborough	Hedda Gabler	Jurgen Tesman
2013	Kyle Soller	Long Day's Journey into Night	Edmund
2014
2014	Jack Lowden	Ghosts	Oswald
2014	Ron Cook	Henry V	Pistol
2014	Mark Gatiss	Coriolanus	Menenius
2014	Ardal O'Hanlon	The Weir	Jim
2015
2015	Nathaniel Parker	Wolf Hall / Bring Up the Bodies	Henry VIII
2015	David Calder	The Nether	Doyle
2015	Richard Goulding	King Charles III	Prince Harry
2015	John Light	Taken at Midnight	Dr Conrad
2016
2016	Mark Gatiss	Three Days in the Country	Shpigelsky
2016	Michael Pennington	The Winter's Tale	Antigonus
2016	Tom Sturridge	American Buffalo	Bobby
2016	David Suchet	The Importance of Being Earnest	Lady Bracknell
2017
2017	Anthony Boyle	Harry Potter and the Cursed Child	Scorpius Malfoy
2017	Freddie Fox	Travesties	Tristan Tzara
2017	Brian J. Smith	The Glass Menagerie	Jim O'Connor
2017	Rafe Spall	Hedda Gabler	Judge Brack
2018
2018	Bertie Carvel	Ink	Rupert Murdoch
2018	John Hodgkinson	The Ferryman	Tom Kettle
2018	James McArdle	Angels in America	Louis Ironson
2018	Peter Polycarpou	Oslo	Ahmed Qurei
2019
2019	Chris Walley	The Lieutenant of Inishmore	Davey
2019	Keir Charles	Quiz	Various
2019	Adam Gillen	Killer Joe	Chris Smith
2019	Adrian Lukis	The Price	Walter Franz
2019	Malcolm Sinclair	Pressure	Dwight D. Eisenhower

=== 2020s ===
Year	Actor	Play	Character
2020
2020	Adrian Scarborough	Leopoldstadt	Hermann Merz
2020	Arinzé Kene	Death of a Salesman	Biff Loman
2020	Colin Morgan	All My Sons	Chris Keller
2020	Reece Shearsmith	A Very Expensive Poison	The President / Jon
2021	Not presented due to extended closing of theatre productions during COVID-19 pandemic (Note: Due to late March 2020 to late July 2021 closing of London theatre productions during the COVID-19 pandemic in England, the 2022 awards recognise productions that launched anytime from February 2020 to February 2022)		
2022
2022	Various performers (Note: Fred Davis, Daisy Franks, Romina Hytten, Tom Larkin, Habib Nasib Nader, Tom Stacy and Scarlet Wilderink)	Life of Pi	Tiger
2022	Dino Fetscher	The Normal Heart	Felix Turner
2022	Nathaniel Parker	The Mirror and the Light	Henry VIII
2022	Danny Lee Wynter	The Normal Heart	Tommy Boatwright
2023
2023	Will Keen	Patriots	Vladimir Putin
2023	Ensemble (Note: Mark Akintimehin, Emmanuel Akwafo, Nnabiko Ejimofor, Darragh Hand, Aruna Jalloh and Kaine Lawrence)	For Black Boys Who Have Considered Suicide When the Hue Gets Too Heavy	Onyx, Pitch, Jet, Sable, Obsidian, Midnight
2023	Elliot Levey	Good	Maurice
2023	David Moorst	To Kill a Mockingbird	Dill Harris
2023	Sule Rimi	Blues for an Alabama Sky	Sam Thomas
2024
2024	Will Close	Dear England	Harry Kane
2024	Paul Hilton	An Enemy of the People	Peter Stockmann
2024	Giles Terera	Clyde's	Montrellous
2024	Luke Thompson	A Little Life	Willem
2024	Zubin Varla	A Little Life	Harold
2025		A Little Life	
2025	Elliot Levey	Giant	Tom Maschler
2025	Jorge Bosch	Kyoto	Raúl Estrada-Oyuela
2025	Tom Edden	Waiting for Godot	Lucky
2025	Ben Whishaw	Bluets	Actor
2026
2026	Paapa Essiedu	All My Sons	Chris Keller
2026	Hammed Animashaun	Dealer’s Choice	Mugsy
2026	Zachary Hart	The Seagull	Simon Medvedenko
2026	Zachary Hart	Stereophonic	Reg
2026	Giles Terera	Oh, Mary!	Mary's Husband

== Multiple awards and nominations for Best Actor in a Supporting Role ==
=== Awards ===
2 Wins

- Adrian Scarborough

=== Nominations ===
3 Nominations

- Adrian Scarborough
- Michael Bryant

2 Nominations

- Edward Petherbridge
- Julian Glover
- David Bradley
- Ken Stott
- Ben Daniels
- Mark Gatiss
- Nathaniel Parker
- Elliot Levey
- Paul Rogers
- Simon Russell Beale
- Ron Cook
- Michael Pennington
- David Suchet
- Giles Terera
- Zachary Hart

== See also ==
- Drama Desk Award for Outstanding Featured Actor in a Play
- Lists of acting awards
- List of awards for supporting actor
- Tony Award for Best Featured Actor in a Play
