= 1977 Laurence Olivier Awards =

Edition of London theatre awards

1977 Society of West End Theatre Awards

The 1977 Society of West End Theatre Awards were held in 1977 in London celebrating excellence in West End theatre by the Society of West End Theatre. The awards would not become the Laurence Olivier Awards, as they are known today, until the 1984 ceremony.

== Winners and nominees ==
Details of winners (in bold) and nominees, in each award category, per the Society of London Theatre.

Play of the Year	Musical of the Year
**The Fire That Consumes by Henry de Montherlant – Mermaid**; Cause Célèbre by Terence Rattigan – Mayfair; Dusa, Fish, Stas and Vi by Pam Gems – National Theatre; State of Revolution by Robert Bolt – National Theatre	**The Comedy of Errors – RSC at the Aldwych**; Bubbling Brown Sugar – Royalty; I Love My Wife – Prince of Wales; Something's Afoot – Ambassadors
Comedy of the Year
**Privates on Parade by Peter Nichols – RSC at the Aldwych**; Bedroom Farce by Alan Ayckbourn – National Theatre; Once a Catholic by Mary O'Malley – Royal Court / Wyndham's; The Kingfisher by William Douglas-Home – Lyric
Actor of the Year in a New Play	Actress of the Year in a New Play
**Michael Bryant as Vladimir Lenin in State of Revolution – National Theatre**; Colin Blakely as Dennis in Just between Ourselves – Queen's; Alec Guinness as Hilary in The Old Country – Queen's; Ralph Richardson as The Author in The Kingfisher – Lyric	**Alison Fiske as Fish in Dusa, Fish, Stas and Vi – Mayfair**; Glenda Jackson as Stevie Smith in Stevie – Vaudeville; Glynis Johns as Alma Rattenbury in Cause Célèbre – Her Majesty's; Rosemary Leach as Vera in Just between Ourselves – Queen's
Actor of the Year in a Revival	Actress of the Year in a Revival
**Ian McKellen as Karsten Bernick in Pillars of the Community – RSC at the Aldwych**; Alan Howard as Jack Rover in Wild Oats – RSC at the Aldwych; Derek Jacobi as Prince Hamlet in Hamlet – Old Vic; Donald Sinden as Lear in King Lear – RSC at the Aldwych	**Judi Dench as Lady Macbeth in Macbeth – RSC at the Warehouse**; Francesca Annis as Cressida in Troilus and Cressida – RSC at the Aldwych; Susan Fleetwood as Nora Clitheroe in The Plough and the Stars – National Theatre; Janet Suzman as Hedda Gabler Tesman in Hedda Gabler – Duke of York's
Performance of the Year in a Musical	Comedy Performance of the Year
**Anna Sharkey as Maggie Wylie in Maggie – Shaftesbury**; Charles Augins as Performer in Bubbling Brown Sugar – Royalty; Helen Glezer as Performer in Bubbling Brown Sugar – Royalty; Wayne Sleep as Oblio in The Point! – Mermaid	**Denis Quilley as Terri Dennis in Privates on Parade – RSC at the Aldwych**; Jane Carr as Mary Mooney in Once a Catholic – Royal Court / Wyndham's; Joan Hickson as Delia in Bedroom Farce – National Theatre; Leslie Phillips in Sextet – Criterion
Actor of the Year in a Supporting Role	Actress of the Year in a Supporting Role
**Nigel Hawthorne as Major Giles Flack in Privates on Parade – RSC at the Aldwych**; Michael Pennington as Mercutio in Romeo and Juliet – RSC at the Aldwych; Paul Rogers as Henry Huxtable in The Madras House – National Theatre; Patrick Ryecart as Eugene Marchbanks in Candida – Albery	**Mona Washbourne as Aunt in Stevie – Vaudeville**; Constance Chapman as Marjorie in Just between Ourselves – Queen's; Anna Manahan as Bessie Burgess in The Plough and the Stars – National Theatre; Elizabeth Spriggs as Lady Would-Be in Volpone – National Theatre
Director of the Year
**Clifford Williams for Wild Oats – RSC at the Aldwych**; Michael Blakemore for Privates on Parade – RSC at the Aldwych; Bernard Miles for The Fire That Consumes – Mermaid; Trevor Nunn for Macbeth – RSC at the Warehouse
Designer of the Year
**John Napier for King Lear – RSC at the Aldwych**; John Bury for Volpone – National Theatre; Tazeena Firth and Timothy O'Brien for Tales from the Vienna Woods – National Theatre; Ralph Koltai for Rosmersholm – Theatre Royal Haymarket
Outstanding Achievement of the Year in Ballet	Outstanding Achievement in Opera
**Romeo and Juliet, London Festival Ballet – London Coliseum**; Maurice Béjart, Ballet of the 20th Century – London Coliseum; The Sleeping Beauty, The Royal Ballet – Royal Opera House; Rudolf Nureyev for choreographing and performing Nureyev and Friends – London Coliseum	**Don Giovanni, Glyndebourne Festival Opera – National Theatre Lyttelton**; The Ice Break, The Royal Opera – Royal Opera House; Toussaint, English National Opera – London Coliseum; Werther, English National Opera – London Coliseum
Society Special Award
**Harry Loman, stage doorman – Criterion**

== Productions with multiple nominations and awards ==
The following 15 productions received multiple nominations:

- 4: Privates on Parade
- 3: Bubbling Brown Sugar and Just between Ourselves
- 2: Bedroom Farce, Cause Célèbre, Dusa, Fish, Stas and Vi, King Lear, Macbeth, Once a Catholic , State of Revolution, Stevie, The Fire That Consumes, The Kingfisher, The Plough and the Stars, Volpone and Wild Oats

The following production received multiple awards:

- 2: Privates on Parade

== See also ==
- 31st Tony Awards
