= Laurence Olivier Award for Actor of the Year in a New Play =

Retired award for London theatre

- Awarded for: Actor of the Year in a New Play
- Location: England
- Presented by: Society of London Theatre
- First award: 1976
- Final award: 1988
- Website: officiallondontheatre.com/olivier-awards/

The Laurence Olivier Award for Actor of the Year in a New Play was an annual award presented by the Society of London Theatre in recognition of the "world-class status of London theatre." The awards were established as the Society of West End Theatre Awards in 1976, and renamed in 1984 in honour of English actor and director Laurence Olivier.

This award was presented from 1976 to 1984, then in 1985 the award was combined with the Actor of the Year in a Revival award to create the Best Actor award. The original Actor of the Year in a New Play award returned one last time, for the 1988 ceremony.

== Winners and nominees ==
=== 1970s ===
Year	Actor	Play	Character
1976
1976	Paul Copley	For King and Country	Pte. Hamp
1976	Richard Beckinsale	Funny Peculiar	Trevor Tinsley
1976	Frank Finlay	Watch It Come Down and Weapons of Happiness	Ben Prosser / Josef Frank
1976	Alec McCowen	The Family Dance	Ben Musgrave
1977
1977	Michael Bryant	State of Revolution	Vladimir Lenin
1977	Colin Blakely	Just Between Ourselves	Dennis
1977	Alec Guinness	The Old Country	Hilary
1977	Ralph Richardson	The Kingfisher	The Author
1978
1978	Tom Conti	Whose Life is it Anyway?	Ken Harrison
1978	Gordon Chater	The Elocution of Benjamin Franklin	Robert O'Brien
1978	John Gielgud	Half-Life	Sir Noel Cunliffe
1978	Peter McEnery	The Jail Diary of Albie Sachs	Albie Sachs
1979
1979	Ian McKellen	Bent	Max
1979	Michael Gambon	Betrayal	Jerry
1979	Dinsdale Landen	Bodies	Mervyn
1979	John Standing	Close of Play	Benedict

=== 1980s ===
Year	Actor	Play	Character
1980
1980	Roger Rees	The Life and Adventures of Nicholas Nickleby	Nicholas Nickleby
1980	Tom Courtenay	The Dresser	Norman
1980	David Schofield	The Elephant Man	John Merrick
1980	Paul Scofield	Amadeus	Antonio Salieri
1981
1981	Trevor Eve	Children of a Lesser God	James
1981	Edward Fox	Quartermaine's Terms	St. John Quartermaine
1981	James Grout	Quartermaine's Terms	Henry Windscape
1981	Karl Johnson	Television Times	Unknown
1982
1982	Ian McDiarmid	Insignificance	Albert Einstein
1982	Rupert Everett	Another Country	Guy
1982	Alec McCowen	The Portage to San Cristobal of A.H.	Adolf Hitler
1982	David Swift	84, Charing Cross Road	Frank Doel
1983
1983	Jack Shepherd	Glengarry Glen Ross	Richard Roma
1983	Michael Gambon	Tales from Hollywood	Ödön von Horváth
1983	Ben Kingsley	Kean	Edmund Kean
1983	Michael Williams	Pack of Lies	Bob Jackson
1984
1984	Brian Cox	Rat in the Skull	Nelson
1984	Ian Charleson	Fool for Love	Eddie
1984	John Kani	"Master Harold"...and the Boys	Willie
1984	Michael Pennington	Strider: The Story of a Horse	Strider
1988
1988	David Haig	Our Country's Good	Second Lieutenant Ralph Clark
1988	Brian Cox	Fashion	Paul Cash
1988	Alec Guinness	A Walk in the Woods	Andrey Botvinnik
1988	David Suchet	Separation	Joe Green

== See also ==
- Best Actor
- Drama Desk Award for Outstanding Actor in a Play
- Lists of acting awards
- Tony Award for Best Actor in a Play
