= Society of London Theatre Special Award =

Annual honorary award for London theatre

Laurence Olivier Award for Society of London Theatre Special Award
- Awarded for: Society of London Theatre Special Award
- Location: United Kingdom
- Presented by: Society of London Theatre
- First award: 1976
- Currently held by: Elaine Paige (2026)
- Website: officiallondontheatre.com/olivier-awards/

The Laurence Olivier Award for Society of London Theatre Special Award is an annual award presented by the Society of London Theatre in recognition of the "world-class status of London theatre." The awards were established as the Society of West End Theatre Awards in 1976, and renamed in 1984 in honour of English actor and director Laurence Olivier, himself a 1979 recipient of this award.

This award was introduced in 1976. In 2020, the award was expanded with additional Special Recognition Recipients, recognizing a larger number of people each year for their lifetime of contributions to commercial British theatre.

== Award winners ==
=== 1970s ===
Year	Recipient
1976	Save London's Theatres Campaign
1977	Harry Loman
1978	Brian Clark
1979	Laurence Olivier

=== 1980s ===
Year	Recipient
1980	Ralph Richardson
1981	~~none presented~~
1982	Charles Wintour
1983	Joan Littlewood
1984	Arnold Goodman
1985	John Gielgud
1986	~~none presented~~
1987	~~none presented~~
1988	Alec Guinness
~~1989~~	~~entire 1989 Oliviers were merged into 1990~~

=== 1990s ===
Year	Recipient
1991	Peggy Ashcroft
1992	Ninette de Valois
1993	Kenneth MacMillan
1994	Sam Wanamaker
1995	~~none presented~~
1996	Harold Pinter
1997	Margaret Harris
1998	David Mirvish
1998	Ed Mirvish
1999	Peter Hall

=== 2000s ===
Year	Recipient
2001	~~none presented~~
2002	Rupert Rhymes
2003	Sam Mendes
2004	Judi Dench
2005	Alan Bennett
2006	Ian McKellen
2007	John Tomlinson
2008	Andrew Lloyd Webber
2009	Alan Ayckbourn

=== 2010s ===
Year	Recipient
2010	Maggie Smith
2011	Stephen Sondheim
2012	Monica Mason
2012	Tim Rice
2013	Michael Frayn
2013	Gillian Lynne
2014	Nicholas Hytner and Nick Starr
2014	Michael White
2015	Sylvie Guillem
2015	Kevin Spacey
2016	~~none presented~~
2017	Kenneth Branagh
2018	David Lan
2019	Matthew Bourne

=== 2020s ===
Year	Category	Recipient
2020	Special Award	Don Black; Ian McKellen
2020	Special Recognition	Jo Hawes; Thelma Holt; Stephen Jameson and Sarah Preece; Peter Roberts
2021	Not presented due to extended closing of theatre productions during COVID-19 pandemic (Note: Due to late March 2020 to late July 2021 closing of London theatre productions during the COVID-19 pandemic in England, the 2022 awards recognise productions that launched anytime from February 2020 to February 2022)	
2022	Special Award	none
2022	Special Recognition	Lisa Burger; Bob King; Gloria Louis; Susie Sainsbury; Sylvia Young
2023	Special Award	none
2023	Special Recognition	Derek Jacobi; Arlene Phillips
2024	Special Award	none
2024	Special Recognition	Sylvia Addison; Vereen Irving; Robert Israel; Richard Walton; Susan Whiddington
2025	Special Award	Rufus Norris
2025	Special Recognition	Rupert Bielby; Bryan Raven; Sue Uings
2026	Special Award	Elaine Paige
2026	Special Recognition	Betty Laine; Linda Tolhurst; David Wood

== See also ==
- Special Tony Award
