= Laurence Olivier Award for Actor of the Year in a Revival =

Retired award for London theatre

- Awarded for: Actor of the Year in a Revival
- Location: England
- Presented by: Society of London Theatre
- First award: 1976
- Final award: 1988
- Website: officiallondontheatre.com/olivier-awards/

The Laurence Olivier Award for Actor of the Year in a Revival was an annual award presented by the Society of London Theatre in recognition of the "world-class status of London theatre." The awards were established as the Society of West End Theatre Awards in 1976, and renamed in 1984 in honour of English actor and director Laurence Olivier.

This award was presented from 1976 to 1984, then in 1985 the award was combined with the Actor of the Year in a New Play award to create the Best Actor award. The original Actor of the Year in a Revival award returned one last time, for the 1988 ceremony.

== Winners and nominees ==
=== 1970s ===
Year	Actor	Play	Character
1976
1976	Alan Howard	Henry IV, Part 1 and 2 and Henry V	Prince Hal / Henry V of England
1976	Tom Conti	Don Juan and The Devil's Disciple	Don Juan / Dick Dudgeon
1976	Albert Finney	Hamlet and Tamburlaine the Great	Prince Hamlet / Tamburlaine
1976	Emrys James	Henry IV, Part 1 and 2 and Henry V	Henry IV of England / Chorus
1977
1977	Ian McKellen	Pillars of the Community	Karsten Bernick
1977	Alan Howard	Wild Oats	Rover
1977	Derek Jacobi	Hamlet	Prince Hamlet
1977	Donald Sinden	King Lear	King Lear
1978
1978	Alan Howard	Coriolanus	Gaius Marcius Coriolanus
1978	Derek Jacobi	Ivanov	Nikolai Ivanov
1978	Timothy West	The Homecoming	Max
1978	Nicol Williamson	Inadmissible Evidence	Bill Maitland
1979
1979	Warren Mitchell	Death of a Salesman	Willy Loman
1979	Michael Bryant	Strife	David Roberts
1979	Jonathan Pryce	The Taming of the Shrew	Petruchio
1979	Patrick Stewart	The Merchant of Venice	Shylock

=== 1980s ===
Year	Actor	Play	Character
1980
1980	Jonathan Pryce	Hamlet	Prince Hamlet
1980	Michael Gambon	The Life of Galileo	Galileo
1980	Alec McCowen	The Browning Version and Harlequinade	Andrew Crocker-Harris / Arthur Gosport
1980	Bob Peck	Othello	Iago
1981
1981	Daniel Massey	Man and Superman	Jack Tanner
1981	Warren Mitchell	The Caretaker	Davies
1981	David Suchet	The Merchant of Venice	Shylock
1981	John Wood	The Provoked Wife	Brute
1982
1982	Stephen Moore	A Doll's House	Torvold Helmer
1982	Joss Ackland	Henry IV, Part 1 and 2	Falstaff
1982	Trevor Peacock	Hobson's Choice	Henry Horatio Hobson
1982	Donald Sinden	Uncle Vanya	Vanya
1983
1983	Derek Jacobi	Cyrano de Bergerac	Cyrano de Bergerac
1983	Alan Bates	A Patriot for Me	Alfred Redl
1983	Rex Harrison	Heartbreak House	Shotover
1983	Bob Peck	King Lear	Lear
1984
1984	Ian McKellen	Wild Honey	Platonov
1984	Miles Anderson	Life Is a Dream	Sigismund
1984	Emrys James	A New Way to Pay Old Debts	Sir Giles
1984	Peter McEnery	The Devils	De Laubardemont
1988
1988	Brian Cox	Titus Andronicus	Titus Andronicus
1988	Alun Armstrong	The Jew of Malta and The Father	Barabas / The Captain
1988	Antony Sher	The Merchant of Venice and Hello and Goodbye	Shylock / Johnnie
1988	Tom Wilkinson	An Enemy of the People	Dr. Stockmann

== See also ==
- Best Actor
- Drama Desk Award for Outstanding Actress in a Play
- Lists of acting awards
- Tony Award for Best Actor in a Play
