= Laurence Olivier Award for Best Director =

Annual award for London theatre

Sir Peter Hall Award for Best Director
- Awarded for: Best Director
- Location: England
- Presented by: Society of London Theatre
- First award: 1976
- Currently held by: Luke Sheppard for Paddington: The Musical (2026)
- Website: officiallondontheatre.com/olivier-awards/

The Sir Peter Hall Award for Best Director is an annual award presented by the Society of London Theatre in recognition of the "world-class status of London theatre." The awards were established as the Society of West End Theatre Awards in 1976, and renamed in 1984 in honour of English actor and director Laurence Olivier.

Introduced in 1976 as the award for Best Director, it was renamed in 2018 in honor of acclaimed theatre director Sir Peter Hall, beginning with the 2019 award ceremony.

In 1991, the category was briefly retired and divided into the categories Best Director of a Play and Best Director of a Musical. These two categories were in turn retired in 1995, and the Best Director award was reinstated.

Robert Icke became the Best Director award's youngest ever winner at the age of 29 in 2016; the record was previously held by Deborah Warner, the 1988 recipient.

Only six women have ever won the award: Deborah Warner, Marianne Elliott, Lyndsey Turner, Miranda Cromwell, Rebecca Frecknall, and Eline Arbo.

== Winners and nominees ==
=== 1970s ===
Year	Director	Production
1976
1976	Jonathan Miller	Three Sisters
1976	Alan Ayckbourn	Confusions, Shakespeare's People and Yahoo
1976	Buzz Goodbody	Occupations and King Lear
1976	Terry Hands	Old World and Henry IV (parts 1 and 2 and Henry V)
1977
1977	Clifford Williams	Wild Oats
1977	Michael Blakemore	Privates on Parade
1977	Bernard Miles	The Fire that Consumes
1977	Trevor Nunn	Macbeth
1978
1978	Terry Hands	Henry VI
1978	Bill Bryden and Sebastian Graham-Jones	Lark Rise
1978	Christopher Morahan	The Philanderer
1978	Harold Prince	Evita
1979
1979	Michael Bogdanov	The Taming of the Shrew
1979	Michael Elliott	The Family Reunion
1979	Trevor Nunn	Once in a Lifetime
1979	Michael Rudman	Death of a Salesman

=== 1980s ===
Year	Director	Production
1980
1980	Trevor Nunn and John Caird	The Life and Adventures of Nicholas Nickleby
1980	John Barton	The Greeks
1980	Peter Hall	Amadeus
1980	John Dexter	Life of Galileo
1981
1981	Peter Wood	On the Razzle
1981	Donald McWhinnie	Translations
1981	Trevor Nunn	Cats
1981	Harold Pinter	Quartermaine's Terms
1982
1982	Richard Eyre	Guys and Dolls
1982	Michael Bogdanov	Uncle Vanya
1982	Adrian Noble	A Doll's House
1982	James Roose-Evans	84, Charing Cross Road
1983
1983	Terry Hands	Cyrano de Bergerac
1983	Bill Bryden	A Midsummer Night's Dream
1983	Barry Kyle	The Taming of the Shrew
1983	Peter Wood	The Rivals
1984
1984	Christopher Morahan	Wild Honey
1984	John Barton	Life's a Dream
1984	Michael Blakemore	Benefactors
1984	Adrian Noble	The Comedy of Errors
1985
1985	Bill Bryden	The Mysteries
1985	Bill Alexander	Richard III
1985	Garry Hines	The Playboy of the Western World
1985	Barry Kyle	Golden Girls and Love's Labour's Lost
1986
1986	Bill Alexander	The Merry Wives of Windsor
1986	Howard Davies	Les Liaisons Dangereuses
1986	Declan Donnellan	A Midsummer Night's Dream
1986	Peter Wood	The American Clock
1987
1987	Declan Donnellan	Le Cid, Twelfth Night and Macbeth
1987	Alan Ayckbourn	A View from the Bridge
1987	Yukio Ninagawa	Macbeth and Medea
1987	Peter Stein	The Hairy Ape
1988
1988	Deborah Warner	Titus Andronicus
1988	Howard Davies	Cat on a Hot Tin Roof, The Secret Rapture and The Shaughraun
1988	Max Stafford-Clark	The Recruiting Officer and Our Country's Good
1988	David Thacker	A Touch of the Poet and An Enemy of the People
1989/90
1989/90	Michael Bogdanov	Wars of the Roses
1989/90	Richard Eyre	Racing Demon and The Voysey Inheritance
1989/90	Nicholas Hytner	Ghetto and Miss Saigon
1989/90	Trevor Nunn	Othello

=== 1990s ===
Year	Director	Production
1996
1996	Sam Mendes	Company and The Glass Menagerie
1996	Richard Eyre	Skylight and La Grande Magia
1996	Adrian Noble	A Midsummer Night's Dream
1996	Matthew Warchus	Volpone and Henry V
1997
1997	Des McAnuff	Tommy
1997	Richard Eyre	John Gabriel Borkman
1997	Anthony Page	A Doll's House
1997	Matthew Warchus	'Art'
1998
1998	Richard Eyre	King Lear
1998	Walter Bobbie	Chicago
1998	Sam Mendes	Othello
1998	Matthew Warchus	Hamlet
1999
1999	Howard Davies	The Iceman Cometh
1999	Sam Mendes	The Blue Room
1999	Trevor Nunn	Oklahoma!
1999	Ian Rickson	The Weir

=== 2000s ===
Year	Director	Production
2000
2000	Trevor Nunn	Summerfolk, The Merchant of Venice and Troilus and Cressida
2000	David Levaux	The Real Thing
2000	Jeremy Sams	Spend Spend Spend
2000	Julie Taymor	The Lion King
2001
2001	Howard Davies	All My Sons
2001	Michael Grandage	Passion Play
2001	Nicholas Hytner	Orpheus Descending
2001	Trevor Nunn	The Cherry Orchard
2001	Ian Talbot	The Pirates of Penzance
2002
2002	Michael Boyd	Henry VI and Richard III
2002	Michael Blakemore	Kiss Me, Kate
2002	Howard Davies	Private Lives
2002	Phelim McDermott and Julian Crouch	Shockheaded Peter
2002	Ian Rickson	Mouth to Mouth
2003
2003	Sam Mendes	Twelfth Night and Uncle Vanya
2003	Matthew Bourne	Play Without Words
2003	Richard Eyre	Vincent in Brixton
2003	Edward Hall	Rose Rage
2004
2004	Michael Grandage	Caligula
2004	Stafford Arima	Ragtime
2004	Gary Griffin	Pacific Overtures
2004	Stewart Lee	Jerry Springer
2005
2005	Nicholas Hytner	The History Boys
2005	Richard Eyre and Matthew Bourne	Mary Poppins
2005	Rufus Norris	Festen
2005	Susan Stroman	The Producers
2006
2006	Richard Eyre	Hedda Gabler
2006	Stephen Daldry	Billy Elliot
2006	Michael Grandage	Don Carlos
2006	Phyllida Lloyd	Mary Stuart
2006	Melly Still	Coram Boy
2007
2007	Dominic Cooke	The Crucible
2007	Sam Buntrock	Sunday in the Park with George
2007	Joe Mantello	Wicked
2008
2008	Rupert Goold	Macbeth
2008	Rob Ashford	Parade
2008	Marianne Elliott and Tom Morris	War Horse
2008	Jack O'Brien	Hairspray
2009
2009	John Tiffany	Black Watch
2009	Terry Johnson	La Cage aux Folles
2009	Des McAnuff	Jersey Boys
2009	Emma Rice	Brief Encounter

=== 2010s ===
Year	Director	Production
2010
2010	Rupert Goold	ENRON
2010	Michael Grandage	Hamlet
2010	Lindsay Posner	A View from the Bridge
2010	Ian Rickson	Jerusalem
2010	Bijan Sheibani	Our Class
2011
2011	Howard Davies	The White Guard
2011	Dominic Cooke	Clybourne Park
2011	Michael Grandage	King Lear
2011	Thea Sharrock	After the Dance
2012
2012	Matthew Warchus	Matilda
2012	Sean Foley	The Ladykillers
2012	Nicholas Hytner	One Man, Two Guvnors
2012	Rufus Norris	London Road
2013
2013	Marianne Elliott	The Curious Incident of the Dog in the Night-Time
2013	Jeremy Herrin	This House
2013	Simon McBurney	The Master and Margarita
2013	Stephen Daldry	The Audience
2014
2014	Lyndsey Turner	Chimerica
2014	Richard Eyre	Ghosts
2014	Maria Friedman	Merrily We Roll Along
2014	Susan Stroman	The Scottsboro Boys
2015
2015	Ivo van Hove	A View from the Bridge
2015	Rupert Goold	King Charles III
2015	Jeremy Herrin	Wolf Hall / Bring Up the Bodies
2015	Josie Rourke	City of Angels
2016
2016	Robert Icke	Oresteia
2016	Rob Ashford and Kenneth Branagh	The Winter's Tale
2016	Matthew Dunster	Hangmen
2016	Jonathan Kent	Gypsy
2017
2017	John Tiffany	Harry Potter and the Cursed Child
2017	Simon Stone	Yerma
2017	John Tiffany	The Glass Menagerie
2017	Matthew Warchus	Groundhog Day
2018
2018	Sam Mendes	The Ferryman
2018	Dominic Cooke	Follies
2018	Marianne Elliott	Angels in America
2018	Rupert Goold	Ink
2018	Thomas Kail	Hamilton
2019
2019	Stephen Daldry	The Inheritance
2019	Christopher Ashley	Come from Away
2019	Marianne Elliott	Company
2019	Rebecca Frecknall	Summer and Smoke
2019	Sam Mendes	The Lehman Trilogy

=== 2020s ===
Year	Director	Production
2020
2020	Marianne Elliott and Miranda Cromwell	Death of a Salesman
2020	Jamie Lloyd	Cyrano de Bergerac
2020	Trevor Nunn	Fiddler on the Roof
2020	Ian Rickson	Uncle Vanya
2021	Not presented due to extended closing of theatre productions during COVID-19 pandemic (Note: Due to late March 2020 to late July 2021 closing of London theatre productions during the COVID-19 pandemic in England, the 2022 awards recognise productions that launched anytime from February 2020 to February 2022)	
2022
2022	Rebecca Frecknall	Cabaret
2022	Michael Longhurst	Constellations
2022	Kathleen Marshall	Anything Goes
2022	Max Webster	Life of Pi
2023
2023	Phelim McDermott	My Neighbour Totoro
2023	Rebecca Frecknall	A Streetcar Named Desire
2023	Robert Hastie	Standing at the Sky's Edge
2023	Justin Martin	Prima Facie
2023	Bartlett Sher	To Kill A Mockingbird
2024
2024	Jamie Lloyd	Sunset Boulevard
2024	Stephen Daldry & Justin Martin	Stranger Things: The First Shadow
2024	Rupert Goold	Dear England
2024	Sam Mendes	The Motive and the Cue
2025
2025	Eline Arbo	The Years
2025	Jordan Fein	Fiddler on the Roof
2025	Nicholas Hytner	Giant
2025	Robert Icke	Oedipus
2026
2026	Luke Sheppard	Paddington
2026	Jordan Fein	Into The Woods
2026	Ed Stambollouian	Kenrex
2026	Lyndsey Turner	1536
2026	Ivo van Hove	All My Sons

== Multiple awards and nominations ==
Note: This list of multiple awards and nominations includes individuals awarded and nominated for the Best Director award (1976–1990, 1996–present), as well as the short-lived (1991–1995) more granular pair of awards for Best Director of a Play and Best Director of a Musical.

=== Awards ===
Three awards

- Howard Davies
- Declan Donnellan
- Richard Eyre
- Sam Mendes

Two awards

- Michael Bogdanov
- Rupert Goold
- Terry Hands
- Nicholas Hytner
- Trevor Nunn
- Deborah Warner
- Marianne Elliott
- John Tiffany

=== Nominations ===
Eleven nominations

- Sam Mendes

Ten nominations

- Richard Eyre
- Trevor Nunn

Six nominations

- Howard Davies
- Nicholas Hytner

Five nominations

- Declan Donnellan
- Rupert Goold
- Michael Grandage
- Adrian Noble
- Marianne Elliott

Four nominations

- Michael Blakemore
- Ian Rickson
- Matthew Warchus

Three nominations

- Michael Bogdanov
- Bill Bryden
- Dominic Cooke
- Terry Hands
- Simon McBurney
- Peter Wood
- Rebecca Frecknall
- John Tiffany
- Stephen Daldry

Two nominations

- Bill Alexander
- Alan Ayckbourn
- John Barton
- Matthew Bourne
- John Caird
- Jeremy Herrin
- Ian Judge
- Barry Kyle
- Jamie Lloyd
- Phyllida Lloyd
- Justin Martin
- Sean Mathias
- Des McAnuff
- Christopher Morahan
- Rufus Norris
- Steven Pimlott
- Harold Prince
- Susan Stroman
- David Thacker
- Deborah Warner
- Phelim McDermott

== See also ==
- Tony Award for Best Direction of a Play
- Tony Award for Best Direction of a Musical
- Drama Desk Award for Outstanding Direction of a Play
- Drama Desk Award for Outstanding Direction of a Musical
