= Laurence Olivier Award for Outstanding Achievement in Dance =

Annual award for London theatre

- Awarded for: Outstanding Achievement in Dance
- Location: England
- Presented by: Society of London Theatre
- First award: 1977
- Currently held by: Eva Yerbabuena for performing in Yerbagüena (2025)
- Website: officiallondontheatre.com/olivier-awards/

The Laurence Olivier Award for Outstanding Achievement in Dance is an annual award presented by the Society of London Theatre in recognition of the "world-class status of London theatre." The awards were established as the Society of West End Theatre Awards in 1976, and renamed in 1984 in honour of English actor and director Laurence Olivier.

This award was first presented in 1977, as Outstanding Achievement of the Year in Ballet, then was retitled to Outstanding Individual Performance of the Year in a New Dance Production in 1983, before settling on the current title in 1986. With the exception of 1983–1985, when the criteria focused only on an individual dancer, this award`s criteria covers the breadth of a commingled group of specialties, including: dancers, choreographers, designers (individual or combination of costume, visual, set, lighting – in dance, as opposed to the individual Olivier awards for designer categories, which also exist), and artistic directors.

== Winners and nominees ==
=== 1970s ===
Year	Nominee	Category	Production
1977
1977	London Festival Ballet	Dance company	Romeo and Juliet
1977	Maurice Béjart	Choreographer/director	Ballet of the 20th Century
1977	The Royal Ballet	Dance company	The Sleeping Beauty
1977	Rudolf Nureyev	Dancer/director	Nureyev and Friends
1978
1978	Robert Cohan	Artistic director	London Contemporary Dance Theatre
1978	Christopher Bruce	Choreographer	Ballet Rambert
1978	Siobhan Davies	Dancer	Harmonica Breakdown
1978	Lynn Seymour	Dancer	A Month in the Country
1979
1979	Peter Schaufuss	Choreographer	La Sylphide
1979	Kenneth MacMillan	Choreographer	Playground
1979	Ballet Rambert	Dance company	The Tempest

=== 1980s ===
Year	Nominee	Category	Production
1980
1980	The Royal Ballet	Dance company	Gloria
1980	Ballet of the 20th Century	Dance company	Gaîté Parisienne
1980	London Festival Ballet	Dance company	Sphinx
1980	The Royal Ballet	Dance company	Rhapsody
1981
1981	Stuttgart Ballet	Dance company	Forgotten Land
1981	London Contemporary Dance Theatre	Dance company	Death and the Maiden
1981	The Royal Ballet	Dance company	Dances of Albion
1981	Sadler's Wells Royal Ballet	Dance company	Night Moves
1982
1982	Ballet de l'Opéra National de Paris	Dance company	Le songe d'une nuit d'été
1982	Ballet Rambert	Dance company	Ghost Dances
1982	The Royal Ballet	Dance company	Illuminations
1982	The Royal Ballet	Dance company	L'Invitation Au Voyage
1983
1983	Alessandra Ferri	Dancer, The Royal Ballet	Valley of Shadows
1983	Patrick Armand	Dancer, Ballet Théâtre Français	Songs of a Wayfarer
1983	Natalia Makarova	Dancer, The Royal Opera	The Nightingale
1983	Koen Onzia	Dancer, London Festival Ballet	The Seasons
1984
1984	David Bintley	Dancer, Sadler's Wells Royal Ballet	Petrushka
1984	Wayne Eagling	Dancer, The Royal Ballet	Different Drummer
1984	Patricia Ruanne	Dancer, London Festival Ballet	Onegin
1985
1985	Yoko Morishita	Dancer, Matsuyama Ballet Company	Giselle
1985	Stephen Jefferies	Dancer, The Royal Ballet	The Sons of Horus
1985	Roland Price	Dancer, Sadler's Wells Royal Ballet	The Sleeping Beauty
1985	Bryony Brind	Dancer, The Royal Ballet	Young Apollo
1986
1986	Ballet Rambert	Dance company	60th Anniversary Season
1986	Bolshoi Ballet	Dance company	Performances at the London Coliseum
1986	Michael Clark	Dancer	Individual Impact and Contribution
1986	Irek Mukhamedov	Dancer	Bolshoi Ballet
1986	Jerome Robbins	Choreographer	Range of Work
1986	Jorge Salavisa	Artistic director	The Ballet Gulbenkian
1987
1987	Trisha Brown	Dancer/choreographer	Season at Sadler's Wells Theatre
1987	London Contemporary Dance Theatre	Dance company	Season at Sadler's Wells Theatre
1987	Richard Alston	Choreographer	Pulcinella and Dutiful Ducks
1987	Merce Cunningham Company	Dance company	Season at Sadler's Wells Theatre
1987	Ichikawa Ennosuke III	Kabuki performer	The Thousand Cherries of Yoshitsune
1988
1988	Kirov Ballet	Dance company	Season in London
1988	London Festival Ballet with special mention to Christopher Bruce for his choreography and Koen Onzia for his performances	Dance company	Swansong and Cruel Garden
1988	Cumbre Flamenca	Dance company	Season at Sadler's Wells Theatre
1988	Hayden Griffin	Designer	Still Life at the Penguin Café
1988	London Contemporary Dance Theatre	Dance company	Arden Court and Shift
1988	Second Stride	Dance company	Weighing the Heart
1989/90
1989/90	London Contemporary Dance Theatre	Dance company	Kim Brandstrup's Orfeo
1989/90	Nina Ananiashvili and Irek Mukhamedov	Dancers	Bolshoi Ballet
1989/90	David Bintley	Choreographer	Hobson's Choice
1989/90	Siobhan Davies	Choreographer	Embarque
1989/90	The Royal Ballet	Dance company	The Prince of the Pagodas
1989/90	Paul Taylor Dance Company	Dance company	Season at Sadler's Wells Theatre

=== 1990s ===
Year	Nominee	Category	Production
1991
1991	Twyla Tharp and Jennifer Tipton	Choreographer and lighting designer	In the Upper Room
1991	Siobhan Davies and Dancers	Choreographer and dancers	Season at Sadler's Wells Theatre
1991	Darcey Bussell	Dancer	Winter Dreams and Stravinsky Violin Concerto
1991	Kenneth MacMillan	Choreographer	Winter Dreams
1991	Mark Morris	Choreographer	Drink to Me Only with Thine Eyes
1991	The Phoenix Dance Company	Dance company	Season at Sadler's Wells Theatre
1992
1992	William Forsythe and The Royal Ballet	Choreographer and performance	In the Middle, Somewhat Elevated
1992	Adventures in Motion Pictures most promising small dance company to present a West End season	Dance company	Season at the Royal Court Theatre
1992	Stephen Jefferies	Dancer	Cyrano
1992	Philippe Genty	Director and concept	Driftings
1992	Graham Lustig and Henk Schut	Choreographer and designer	Inscape
1992	Northern Ballet Theatre	Dance company	Romeo and Juliet
1993
1993	Siobhan Davies	Choreographer	Winnsboro Cotton Mill Blues
1993	David Bintley	Choreographer	Tombeaux
1993	Lez Brotherston	Scenery and costume designer	Northern Ballet Theatre's Season at the Royalty Theatre
1993	Joseph Cipolla	Dancer	The Green Table
1994
1994	London Contemporary Dance Theatre	Dance company	Season at Sadler's Wells
1994	Darcey Bussell	Dancer	Ballet Imperial and La Ronde
1994	Sylvie Guillem	Dancer	Herman Schmerman
1994	Marion Tait	Dancer	Romeo and Juliet
1995
1995	Peter Mumford	Lighting designer	Fearful Symmetries and The Glass Blew In
1995	Thomas Edur	Dancer	The Sleeping Beauty
1995	John MacFarlane	Designer	The Nutcracker
1995	Nuria Moreno	Dancer	Cinderella
1996
1996	Siobhan Davies	Choreographer	The Art of Touch
1996	Deborah Bull	Dancer	Steptext
1996	Sylvie Guillem	Dancer	Episodes
1996	Marion Tait	Dancer	Pillar of Fire
1997
1997	Rambert Dance Company	Dance company	Season at the London Coliseum
1997	Sue Blane	Designer	Alice in Wonderland
1997	Viviana Durante	Dancer	Anastasia and ...Now Langourous, Now Wild...
1997	Thomas Edur	Dancer	Alice in Wonderland and Giselle
1998
1998	Lez Brotherston	Set design and costume	Cinderella
1998	Altynai Asylmuratova	Dancer	Swan Lake
1998	Mark Morris	Choreographer	L'Allegro, il Penseroso ed il Moderato
1999
1999	William Forsythe and Ballett Frankfurt	Choreographer/artistic director and dance company	Season at Sadler's Wells
1999	Trisha Brown	Choreographer	L'Orfeo
1999	Bill T. Jones and company	Choreographer/dancer and dancers	We Set Out Early...Visibility Was Poor
1999	Twyla Tharp and company	Choreographer/dancer and dancers	Season at the Barbican Theatre

=== 2000s ===
Year	Nominee	Category	Production
2000
2000	Jirí Kylián	Choreographer/director	NDT I's season at Sadler's Wells
2000	Nina Ananiashvili	Dancer	Don Quixote
2000	Pina Bausch and company	Concept and production	Viktor
2000	David Bintley and creative team	Choreographer, designers, music	Edward II
2001
2001	Deborah Colker	Choreographer	Mix
2001	Matthew Bourne	Concept and dramatisation	The Car Man
2001	Robert Parker	Dancer	Shakespeare Suite
2001	Michael Revie	Dancer	Mozartina
2002
2002	Mark Morris	Choreographer/director	Mark Morris Dance Group's season at Sadler's Wells
2002	Ushio Amagatsu	Concept, direction, choreography and performance	Hibiki
2002	Dana Caspersen	Dancer	Artifact and Eidos:Telos
2002	William Forsythe	Choreographer	Artifact and Eidos:Telos
2003
2003	Robyn Orlin	Choreographer	Daddy, I've Seen This Piece Six Times and I Still Don't Know Why They're Hurting Each Other
2003	Tanztheater Wuppertal Pina Bausch	Dance company	Kontakthof
2003	Chiaki Nagao	Dancer	Madame Butterfly
2003	Christopher Wheeldon	Choreographer	Tryst and Polyphonia
2004
2004	Thomas Edur and Agnes Oaks	Dancers	2 Human
2004	Carlos Acosta	Dancer and choreographer	Tocororo - A Cuban Tale
2004	Javier de Frutos	Choreographer	Elsa Canasta
2004	Rambert Dance Company	Dance company	Season at Sadler's Wells
2005
2005	San Francisco Ballet	Dance company	Season at Sadler's Wells
2005	Julien Macdonald	Costume designer	Shimmer
2005	The Royal Ballet	Dance company	Sylvia
2005	Rambert Dance Company	Dance company	Season at Sadler's Wells
2006
2006	Pina Bausch	Choreographer	Nelken and Palermo, Palermo
2006	Ballet Nacional de Cuba	Corps de ballet (dancers) specifically	Season at Sadler's Wells
2006	Johan Kobborg	Dancer and director	The Lesson and La Sylphide
2006	Russell Maliphant	Choreographer/dancer	PUSH
2007
2007	Carlos Acosta	Dancer and producer	Season at Sadler's Wells
2007	Steven McRae	Dancer	Homage to the Queen and Chroma
2007	Marianela Núñez	Dancer	DGV, The Sleeping Beauty, Acosta season at Sadler's Wells
2007	Wayne McGregor	Choreographer	Chroma
2008
2008	The Royal Ballet	Dance company	Jewels
2008	Savion Glover	Dancer	Live for London
2008	Jonathan Goddard	Dancer	Performances with Richard Alston Dance Company
2008	Wendy Whelan	Dancer	Fool's Paradise
2009
2009	Royal Ballet of Flanders	Dance company	Impressing the Czar
2009	The Royal Ballet	Dance company	Infra
2009	Savion Glover, Marshall Davis, Jr. and Maurice Chestnut	Dancers	Bare Soundz

=== 2010s ===
Year	Nominee	Category	Production
2010
2010	Rambert Dance Company	Dance company	Outstanding Year of New Work
2010	Colin Dunne	Dancer	Out of Time
2010	Michael Hulls	Lighting designer	Two:Four:Ten, Afterlight, Ex Machina and Eonnagata
2011
2011	Antony Gormley	Visual designer	Babel (Words)
2011	John MacFarlane	Designer	Asphodel Meadows
2011	Yoshie Sunahata (Kodo)	Drummer	Gnosis
2012
2012	Edward Watson	Dancer	The Metamorphosis
2012	The Design Team	Set, costume, lighting, visual projections	Alice's Adventures in Wonderland
2012	Tommy Franzen	Dancer	Some Like It Hip Hop
2012	Sylvie Guillem	Dancer	6000 Miles Away
2013
2013	Marianela Núñez	Dancer	Aeternum, Diana and Acteon and Viscera
2013	ILL-Abilities	Dance company	Breakin' Convention
2013	Lez Brotherston	Set and costume designer	The Sleeping Beauty
2014
2014	Michael Hulls	Lighting designer	Body of work including Ballet Boyz: The Talent
2014	Mark Morris	Dancer and choreographer	Season at Sadler's Wells
2014	Arthur Pita	Choreographer	Ballet Black: A Dream Within a Midsummer Night's Dream
2014	Clemmie Sveaas	Dancer	Witch-Hunt
2015
2015	Crystal Pite	Choreographer	A Picture of You Falling, The Tempest Replica and Polaris
2015	Rocío Molina	Dancer	Bosque Ardora
2015	The Elders Project	Dance group	Elixir Festival
2015	Christopher Wheeldon	Choreographer	The Winter's Tale
2016
2016	Alessandra Ferri	Dancer	Chéri and Woolf Works
2016	Javier de Frutos	Choreographer	Anatomy of a Passing Cloud
2016	Sasha Waltz	Choreographer	Sacre
2017
2017	English National Ballet	Dance company	Akram Khan's Giselle and She Said
2017	Alvin Ailey American Dance Theater	Dance company	Season at Sadler's Wells
2017	Luke Ahmet	Dancer	The Creation
2018
2018	Francesca Velicu	Dancer	Pina Bausch's Le Sacre Du Printemps
2018	Rocío Molina	Dancer	Fallen from Heaven (Caída del Cielo)
2018	Zenaida Yanowsky	Dancer	Liam Scarlett's Symphonic Dances
2019
2019	Akram Khan	Dancer	Xenos
2019	John MacFarlane	Designer	Swan Lake
2019	Dimitris Papaioannou	Choreographer	The Great Tamer

=== 2020s ===
Year	Nominee	Category	Production
2020
2020	Sara Baras	Choreographer and Dancer	Ballet Flamenco Sobras
2020	Anne Teresa De Keersmaeker	Dancer	Mitten wir im Leben sind/Bach6Cellosuiten
2020	Gisèle Vienne	Choreographer	Crowd and Dance Umbrella
2021	Not presented due to extended closing of theatre productions during COVID-19 pandemic (Note: Due to late March 2020 to late July 2021 closing of London theatre productions during the COVID-19 pandemic in England, the 2022 awards recognise productions that launched anytime from February 2020 to February 2022)		
2022
2022	Arielle Smith	Choreographer	Jolly Folly in Reunion
2022	Acosta Danza	Dance company	De Punta A Cabo in 100% Cuban
2022	NDT2 Dancers	Dancers	NDT2 Tour
2022	Edward Watson	Dancer	Wayne McGregor's The Dante Project
2023
2023	Dickson Mbi	Choreographer	Enowate
2023	Manuel Liñán	Choreographer	¡VIVA!
2023	Raquel Meseguer Zafe	Dramaturg	Ruination by Lost Dog
2023	Catrina Nisbett	Dancer	Family Honour by Spoken Movement
2024
2024	Isabela Coracy	Dancer	NINA: By Whatever Means, part of :Ballet Black:Pioneers
2024	Jonzi D	Artistic Director	Breakin' Convention 2023 International Festival of Hip Hop Dance Theatre
2024	Rhiannon Faith	Concept	Lay Down Your Burdens
2025
2025	Eva Yerbabuena	Dancer	Yerbagüena
2025	Sarah Chun	Dancer	Three Short Ballets
2025	Tom Visser & Jay Gower Taylor	Lighting Concept and Design of Angels' Atlas	Frontiers: Choreographers of Canada - Pite/Kudelka/Portner
