= Laurence Olivier Award for Best Comedy Performance =

Retired award for London theatre

- Awarded for: Best Comedy Performance
- Location: England
- Presented by: Society of London Theatre
- First award: 1976
- Final award: 1995
- Website: officiallondontheatre.com/olivier-awards/

The Laurence Olivier Award for Best Comedy Performance was an annual award presented by the Society of London Theatre in recognition of the "world-class status of London theatre." The awards were established as the Society of West End Theatre Awards in 1976, and renamed in 1984 in honour of English actor and director Laurence Olivier.

This commingled actor/actress award was introduced in 1976, and was last presented at the 1995 ceremony, after which it was retired. On the 19 occasions that this award was given, it was presented three times to an actress and 16 times to an actor.

== Winners and nominees ==
=== 1970s ===
Year	Actor	Production	Character
1976
1976	Penelope Keith	Donkeys' Years	Lady Driver
1976	Peter Barkworth	Crown Matrimonial	Edward VIII
1976	Richard Beckinsale	Funny Peculiar	Trevor Tinsley
1976	Geraldine McEwan	Oh, Coward!	Performer
1977
1977	Denis Quilley	Privates on Parade	Terri Dennis
1977	Jane Carr	Once a Catholic	Mary Mooney
1977	Joan Hickson	Bedroom Farce	Delia
1977	Leslie Phillips	Sextet	Unknown
1978
1978	Ian McKellen	The Alchemist	Face
1978	Sheila Hancock	Annie	Miss Hannigan
1978	Geraldine McEwan	Look After Lulu!	Lulu
1978	Donald Sinden	Shut Your Eyes and Think of England	Performer
1979
1979	Barry Humphries	A Night with Dame Edna	Dame Edna Everage
1979	Richard Griffiths	Once in a Lifetime	George Lewis
1979	Oscar James	Gloo Joo	Meadowlark Warner
1979	Maureen Lipman	Outside Edge	Maggie

=== 1980s ===
Year	Actor	Production	Character
1980
1980	Beryl Reid	Born in the Gardens	Maud
1980	Edward Duke	Jeeves Takes Charge	Jeeves
1980	Ben Kingsley	The Merry Wives of Windsor	Ford
1980	Julie Walters	Educating Rita	Rita
1981
1981	Rowan Atkinson	Rowan Atkinson in Revue	Himself
1981	Georgina Hale	Steaming	Josie
1981	Donald Sinden	Present Laughter	Garry Essendine
1981	Angela Thorne	Anyone for Denis?	Margaret Thatcher
1982
1982	Geoffrey Hutchings	Poppy	Lady Dodo
1982	Jane Carr	A Midsummer Night's Dream	Hermia
1982	Paul Eddington	Noises Off	Lloyd Dallas
1982	Bill Paterson	Schweik in the Second World War	Schweyk
1983
1983	Griff Rhys Jones	Charley's Aunt	Lord Fancourt Babberley
1983	Susan Colverd	The Provok'd Wife	Lady Brute
1983	Michael Hordern	The Rivals	Sir Anthony Absolute
1983	Peter Ustinov	Beethoven's Tenth	Ludwig van Beethoven
1984
1984	Maureen Lipman	See How They Run	Miss Skillon
1984	Lavinia Bertram	Intimate Exchanges	Various Characters
1984	Leonard Rossiter	Loot	Truscott
1984	Michael Williams	Two into One	George
1985
1985	Michael Gambon	A Chorus of Disapproval	Dafydd Llewellyn
1985	Roger Rees	Love's Labours Lost	Berowne
1985	Griff Rhys Jones	Trumpets and Raspberries	Antonio Berardi / Agnelli
1985	Maggie Smith	The Way of the World	Mrs. Millamant
1986
1986	Bill Fraser	When We Are Married	Gerald Forbes
1986	Brian Cox	Misalliance	John Tarleton
1986	Nigel Hawthorne	The Magistrate	Posket
1986	Paul Scofield	I'm Not Rappaport	Nat
1987
1987	John Woodvine	The Henrys	Falstaff
1987	Frank Ferrante	Groucho: A Life in Revue	Groucho Marx
1987	Geoffrey Hutchings	Three Men on a Horse	Irwin
1987	Les Marsden	Groucho: A Life in Revue	Harpo Marx
1988
1988	Alex Jennings	Too Clever by Half	Gloumov
1988	Kenneth Branagh	As You Like It	Celia
1988	Lesley Sharp	A Family Affair	Lipochka
1988	Sian Thomas	Countrymania	Vittoria
1989/90
1989/90	Michael Gambon	Man of the Moment	Douglas Beechey
1989/90	Alex Jennings	The Liar	Dorante
1989/90	Alfred Molina	Speed-the-Plow	Fox
1989/90	Peter O'Toole	Jeffrey Bernard is Unwell	Jeffrey Bernard

=== 1990s ===
Year	Actor	Production	Character
1991
1991	Alan Cumming	Accidental Death of an Anarchist	The Madman
1991	Richard Briers	The Wind in the Willows	Rat
1991	Griff Rhys Jones	The Wind in the Willows	Mr. Toad
1991	Joseph Maher	What the Butler Saw	Dr. Rance
1992
1992	Desmond Barrit	The Comedy of Errors	Antipholus of Ephesus / Antipholus of Syracuse
1992	Robin Bailey	Black Snow	Ivan Vassilevich
1992	Alan Cumming	La Bête	Valere
1992	Lia Williams	The Revengers' Comedies	Karen
1993
1993	Simon Cadell	Travels with My Aunt	Henry Pulling
1993	Sara Crowe	Hay Fever	Sorel Bliss
1993	Guy Henry	The Alchemist	Ananias
1993	Robert Lindsay	Cyrano de Bergerac	Cyrano de Bergerac
1994
1994	Griff Rhys Jones	An Absolute Turkey	Redillon
1994	Ken Campbell	Jamais Vu	Performer
1994	Nicholas Le Prevost	An Absolute Turkey	Pontagnac
1994	Maggie Smith	The Importance of Being Earnest	Lady Bracknell
1995
1995	Niall Buggy	Dead Funny	Brian
1995	Nigel Hawthorne	The Clandestine Marriage	Lord Ogleby
1995	Tony Slattery	Neville's Island	Gordon
1995	Debra Gillett	The Country Wife	Mrs. Pinchwife
