= 1979 Laurence Olivier Awards =

Edition of London theatre awards

1979 Society of West End Theatre Awards
- Location: Café Royal

The 1979 Society of West End Theatre Awards were held in 1979 in London at the Café Royal, celebrating excellence in West End theatre by the Society of West End Theatre. The awards would not become the Laurence Olivier Awards, as they are known today, until the 1984 ceremony.

== Winners and nominees ==
Details of winners (in bold) and nominees, in each award category, per the Society of London Theatre.

| Play of the Year | Musical of the Year |
|---|---|
| **Betrayal by Harold Pinter – National Theatre**; Night and Day by Tom Stoppard – Phoenix; The Crucifer of Blood by Arthur Conan Doyle, adapted by Paul Giovanni – Theatre Royal Haymarket; Undiscovered Country by Arthur Schnitzler, adapted by Tom Stoppard – National Theatre | **Songbook – Globe**; Ain't Misbehavin' – Her Majesty's; Bar Mitzvah Boy – Adelphi; Chicago – Cambridge |
Comedy of the Year
**Middle-Age Spread by Roger Hall – Lyric**; Clouds by Michael Frayn – Duke of York's; Outside Edge by Richard Harris – Queen's Theatre
| Actor of the Year in a New Play | Actress of the Year in a New Play |
| **Ian McKellen as Max in Bent – Royal Court / Criterion**; Michael Gambon as Jerry in Betrayal – National Theatre; Dinsdale Landen as Mervyn in Bodies – Ambassadors; John Standing as Benedict in Close of Play – National Theatre | **Jane Lapotaire as Édith Piaf in Piaf – RSC at the Warehouse**; Constance Cummings as Emily Stilson in Wings – National Theatre; Gemma Jones as Helen Stott in And a Nightingale Sang – Queen's Theatre; Jessica Tandy as Fonsia Dorsey in The Gin Game – Lyric |
| Actor of the Year in a Revival | Actress of the Year in a Revival |
| **Warren Mitchell as Willy Loman in Death of a Salesman – National Theatre**; Michael Bryant as David Roberts in Strife – National Theatre; Jonathan Pryce as Petruchio in The Taming of the Shrew – RSC at the Aldwych; Patrick Stewart as Shylock in The Merchant of Venice – RSC at the Warehouse | **Zoë Wanamaker as May Daniels in Once in a Lifetime – RSC at the Aldwych**; Paola Dionisotti as Kate Minola in The Taming of the Shrew – RSC at the Aldwych; Glenda Jackson as Cleopatra in Antony and Cleopatra – RSC at the Aldwych; Billie Whitelaw as Winnie in Happy Days – Royal Court |
| Actor of the Year in a Musical | Actress of the Year in a Musical |
| **Anton Rodgers as Various in Songbook – Globe**; Tony Britton as Henry Higgins in My Fair Lady – Adelphi; Michael Crawford as Charlie Gordon in Charlie and Algernon – Queen's Theatre; Ben Cross as Billy Flynn in Chicago – Cambridge | **Virginia McKenna as Anna Leonowens in The King and I – London Palladium**; Carol Channing as Dolly Levi in Hello, Dolly – Theatre Royal Drury Lane; Antonia Ellis as Velma Kelly in Chicago – Cambridge; Liz Robertson as Eliza Doolittle in My Fair Lady – Adelphi |
Comedy Performance of the Year
**Barry Humphries as Dame Edna Everage in A Night with Dame Edna – Piccadilly**; Richard Griffiths as George Lewis in Once in a Lifetime – RSC at the Aldwych; Oscar James as Meadowlark Warner in Gloo Joo – Criterion; Maureen Lipman as Maggie in Outside Edge – Queen's
| Actor of the Year in a Supporting Role | Actress of the Year in a Supporting Role |
| **Patrick Stewart as Mark Antony in Antony and Cleopatra – RSC at the Aldwych**; Michael Bryant as Dr. von Aigner in Undiscovered Country – National Theatre; Stephen Greif as Biff Loman in Death of a Salesman – National Theatre; David Suchet as Herman Glogauer in Once in a Lifetime – RSC at the Aldwych | **Doreen Mantle as Linda Loman in Death of a Salesman – National Theatre**; Carmen du Sautoy as Miss Leighton in Once in a Lifetime – RSC at the Aldwych; Alison Fiske as Evie Ardsley in For Services Rendered – National Theatre; Patricia Routledge as Peggy Stott in And a Nightingale Sang – Queen's |
Director of the Year
**Michael Bogdanov for The Taming of the Shrew – RSC at the Aldwych**; Michael Elliott for The Family Reunion – Vaudeville; Trevor Nunn for Once in a Lifetime – RSC at the Aldwych; Michael Rudman for Death of a Salesman – National Theatre
Designer of the Year
**William Dudley for Undiscovered Country – National Theatre**; John Bury for Strife – National Theatre; John Napier for Once in a Lifetime – RSC at the Aldwych; Carl Toms for For Services Rendered – National Theatre
| Outstanding Achievement of the Year in Ballet | Outstanding Achievement in Opera |
| **Peter Schaufuss for La Sylphide, London Festival Ballet – Royal Festival Hall**; Kenneth MacMillan for Playground, The Royal Ballet – Sadler's Wells; The Tempest, Ballet Rambert – Sadler's Wells | **The Rake's Progress, The Royal Opera – Royal Opera House**; Die Zauberflöte, The Royal Opera – Royal Opera House; Manon, English National Opera – London Coliseum; The Adventures of Mr Brouček, English National Opera – London Coliseum |
Society Special Award
**Laurence Olivier**

== Productions with multiple nominations and awards ==
The following 13 productions received multiple nominations:

- 6: Once in a Lifetime
- 4: Death of a Salesman
- 3: Chicago, The Taming of the Shrew and Undiscovered Country
- 2: And a Nightingale Sang, Antony and Cleopatra, Betrayal, For Services Rendered, My Fair Lady, Outside Edge, Songbook and Strife

The following two productions received multiple awards:

- 2: Death of a Salesman and Songbook

== See also ==
- 33rd Tony Awards
