= Laurence Olivier Award for Best Entertainment or Comedy Play =

Annual award for London Theatre

Noël Coward Award for Best Entertainment or Comedy Play
- Awarded for: Best New Comedy
- Location: England
- Presented by: Society of London Theatre
- First award: 1976
- Currently held by: Oh, Mary! (2026)
- Website: officiallondontheatre.com/olivier-awards/

The Noël Coward Award for Best Entertainment or Comedy Play is an annual award presented by the Society of London Theatre in recognition of the "world-class status of London theatre." The awards were established as the Society of West End Theatre Awards in 1976, and renamed in 1984 in honour of English actor and director Laurence Olivier.

The award was titled Comedy of the Year from its establishment in 1976 until 1990, was renamed to Best Comedy starting in 1991, Best New Comedy starting in 1999, then retitled to its current name for the 2020 Olivier Awards – when "Entertainment" was moved to join Best Comedy Play from the Best Entertainment and Family award, which was renamed Best Family Show at that same time.

== Winners and nominees ==
=== 1970s ===
Year	Play	Writer
1976
1976	Donkeys' Years	Michael Frayn
1976	The Bed Before Yesterday	Ben Travers
1976	Confusions	Alan Ayckbourn
1976	Funny Peculiar	Mike Stott
1977
1977	Privates on Parade	Peter Nichols
1977	Bedroom Farce	Alan Ayckbourn
1977	Once a Catholic	Mary O'Malley
1977	The Kingfisher	William Douglas-Home
1978
1978	Filumena	Eduardo De Filippo, Keith Waterhouse and Willis Hall
1978	Shut Your Eyes and Think of England	John Chapman and Anthony Marriott
1978	Ten Times Table	Alan Ayckbourn
1979
1979	Middle-Age Spread	Roger Hall
1979	Clouds	Michael Frayn
1979	Outside Edge	Richard Harris

=== 1980s ===
Year	Play	Writer
1980
1980	Educating Rita	Willy Russell
1980	Born in the Gardens	Peter Nichols
1980	Make and Break	Michael Frayn
1980	Sisterly Feelings	Alan Ayckbourn
1981
1981	Steaming	Nell Dunn
1981	Anyone for Denis?	John Wells
1981	Can't Pay? Won't Pay!	Dario Fo
1981	On the Razzle	Tom Stoppard
1982
1982	Noises Off	Michael Frayn
1982	Key for Two	John Chapman and Dave Freeman
1982	Season's Greetings	Alan Ayckbourn
1982	Trafford Tanzi	Claire Luckham
1983
1983	Daisy Pulls It Off	Denise Deegan
1983	Beethoven's Tenth	Peter Ustinov
1983	Run for Your Wife	Ray Cooney
1983	Woza Albert!	Barney Simon, Percy Mtwa and Mbongeni Ngema
1984
1984	Up 'n' Under	John Godber
1984	Gymslip Vicar	Cliff Hanger
1984	Intimate Exchanges	Alan Ayckbourn
1984	Two into One	Ray Cooney
1985
1985	A Chorus of Disapproval	Alan Ayckbourn
1985	Bouncers	John Godber
1985	Love's Labours Lost	William Shakespeare
1985	Pravda	Howard Brenton and David Hare
1986
1986	When We Are Married	J.B. Priestley
1986	Lend Me a Tenor	Ken Ludwig
1986	The Merry Wives of Windsor	William Shakespeare
1986	A Midsummer Night's Dream	William Shakespeare
1987
1987	Three Men on a Horse	John Cecil Holm and George Abbott
1987	Groucho: A Life in Revue	Arthur Marx and Robert Fisher
1987	A Midsummer Night's Dream	William Shakespeare
1987	Twelfth Night	William Shakespeare
1988
1988	Shirley Valentine	Willy Russell
1988	Henceforward...	Alan Ayckbourn
1988	Separation	Tom Kempinski
1988	The Common Pursuit	Simon Gray
1989/90
1989/90	Single Spies	Alan Bennett
1989/90	Jeffrey Bernard is Unwell	Keith Waterhouse
1989/90	Some Americans Abroad	Richard Nelson
1989/90	Steel Magnolias	Robert Harling

=== 1990s ===
Year	Play	Writer
1991
1991	Out of Order	Ray Cooney
1991	Gasping	Ben Elton
1992
1992	La Bête	David Hirson
1992	An Evening with Gary Lineker	Arthur Smith and Chris England
1992	It's Ralph	Hugh Whitemore
1993
1993	The Rise and Fall of Little Voice	Jim Cartwright
1993	Lost in Yonkers	Neil Simon
1993	On the Piste	John Godber
1994
1994	Hysteria	Terry Johnson
1994	April in Paris	John Godber
1994	The Life of Stuff	Simon Donald
1994	Time of My Life	Alan Ayckbourn
1995
1995	My Night with Reg	Kevin Elyot
1995	Beautiful Thing	Jonathan Harvey
1995	Dead Funny	Terry Johnson
1995	Neville's Island	Tim Firth
1996
1996	Mojo	Jez Butterworth
1996	Communicating Doors	Alan Ayckbourn
1996	Funny Money	Ray Cooney
1997
1997	'Art'	Yasmina Reza
1997	The Complete Works of William Shakespeare (Abridged)	Adam Long, Daniel Singer and Jess Winfield
1997	Laughter on the 23rd Floor	Neil Simon
1998
1998	Popcorn	Ben Elton
1998	East is East	Ayub Khan-Din
1998	A Skull in Connemara	Martin McDonagh
1999
1999	Cleo, Camping, Emmanuelle and Dick	Terry Johnson
1999	Alarms and Excursions	Michael Frayn
1999	Love Upon the Throne	Patrick Barlow, Martin Duncan and John Ramm
1999	Things We Do for Love	Alan Ayckbourn

=== 2000s ===
Year	Play	Writer
2000
2000	The Memory of Water	Shelagh Stephenson
2000	Comic Potential	Alan Ayckbourn
2000	Quartet	Ronald Harwood
2001
2001	Stones in His Pockets	Marie Jones
2001	Cooking with Elvis	Lee Hall
2001	House/Garden	Alan Ayckbourn
2001	Peggy for You	Alan Plater
2002
2002	The Play What I Wrote	Hamish McColl, Sean Foley and Eddie Braben
2002	Boston Marriage	David Mamet
2002	Caught in the Net	Ray Cooney
2002	Feelgood	Alistair Beaton
2003
2003	The Lieutenant of Inishmore	Martin McDonagh
2003	RolePlay	Alan Ayckbourn
2003	Dinner	Moira Buffini
2003	Lobby Hero	Kenneth Lonergan
2006
2006	Heroes	Gérald Sibleyras and Tom Stoppard
2006	Glorious!	Peter Quilter
2006	Shoot the Crow	Owen McCafferty
2007
2007	The 39 Steps	Patrick Barlow, Simon Corble and Nobby Dimon
2007	Don Juan in Soho	Patrick Marber
2007	Love Song	John Kolvenbach
2008
2008	Rafta, Rafta...	Bill Naughton and Ayub Khan-Din
2008	Absurdia: The Crimson Hotel	Michael Frayn
2008	Elling	Simon Bent
2008	Whipping It Up	Stephen Thompson
2009
2009	God of Carnage	Yasmina Reza
2009	Fat Pig	Neil LaBute
2009	The Female of the Species	Joanna Murray-Smith

=== 2010s ===
Year	Play	Writer
2010
2010	The Priory	Michael Wynne
2010	Calendar Girls	Tim Firth
2010	England People Very Nice	Richard Bean
2010	Parlour Song	Jez Butterworth
2014
2014	Jeeves and Wooster in Perfect Nonsense	Robert Goodale and David Goodale
2014	The Duck House	Dan Patterson and Colin Swash
2014	The Full Monty	Simon Beaufoy
2014	The Same Deep Water as Me	Nick Payne
2015
2015	The Play That Goes Wrong	Henry Shields, Jonathan Sayer and Henry Lewis
2015	Handbagged	Moira Buffini
2015	Shakespeare in Love	Marc Norman, Tom Stoppard and Lee Hall
2016
2016	Nell Gwynn	Jessica Swale
2016	A Christmas Carol	Patrick Barlow
2016	Hand to God	Robert Askins
2016	Peter Pan Goes Wrong	Henry Shields, Jonathan Sayer and Henry Lewis
2017
2017	Our Ladies of Perpetual Succour	Lee Hall
2017	The Comedy About a Bank Robbery	Henry Shields, Jonathan Sayer and Henry Lewis
2017	Nice Fish	Mark Rylance and Louis Jenkins
2017	The Truth	Florian Zeller in a version by Christopher Hampton
2018
2018	Labour of Love	James Graham
2018	Dry Powder	Sarah Burgess
2018	Mischief Movie Night	Mischief Theatre
2018	The Miser	Molière in an adaptation by Sean Foley and Phil Porter
2019
2019	Home, I'm Darling	Laura Wade
2019	Nine Night	Natasha Gordon
2019	Quiz	James Graham

=== 2020s ===
Year	Play	Writer
2020	Emilia	Morgan Lloyd Malcolm
2020	Fleabag	Phoebe Waller-Bridge
2020	Magic Goes Wrong	Henry Shields, Jonathan Sayer and Henry Lewis
2020	The Upstart Crow	Ben Elton
2021	Not presented due to extended closing of theatre productions during COVID-19 pandemic (Note: Due to late March 2020 to late July 2021 closing of London theatre productions during the COVID-19 pandemic in England, the 2022 awards recognise productions that launched anytime from February 2020 to February 2022)	
2022	Pride and Prejudice* (*sort of)	Isobel McArthur
2022	The Choir of Man	Nic Doodson, Andrew Kay, Jack Blume, Ben Norris, Freddie Huddleston
2022	Pantoland at the Palladium	Michael Harrison
2022	The Shark Is Broken	Joseph Nixon and Ian Shaw
2023
2023	My Neighbour Totoro	Tom Morton-Smith
2023	Jack and the Beanstalk	Michael Harrison
2023	My Son's a Queer (But What Can You Do?)	Rob Madge
2023	One Woman Show	Liz Kingsman
2024
2024	Stranger Things: The First Shadow	Kate Trefry
2024	Accidental Death of an Anarchist	Dario Fo & Franca Rame, adapted by Tom Basden
2024	Stephen Sondheim's Old Friends	Stephen Sondheim
2024	Vardy V Rooney: The Wagatha Christie Trial	adapted by Liv Hennessy
2025
2025	Titanique	Tye Blue, Marla Mindelle, & Constantine Rousouli
2025	Ballet Shoes	adapted by Kendall Feaver
2025	Inside No. 9 Stage/Fright	Steve Pemberton & Reece Shearsmith
2025	Spirited Away	adapted by John Caird & co-adapted by Maoko Imai
2026
2026	Oh, Mary!	Cole Escola
2026	The Comedy about Spies	Henry Lewis and Henry Shields
2026	Every Brilliant Thing	Duncan Macmillan with Jonny Donahoe
2026	Paranormal Activity	Oren Peli, adapted by Levi Holloway

== See also ==
- Critics' Circle Theatre Award for Best New Play
- Evening Standard Theatre Award for Best Play
- Tony Award for Best Play
