= 1982 Laurence Olivier Awards =

Edition of London theatre awards

1982 Society of West End Theatre Awards

The 1982 Society of West End Theatre Awards were held in 1982 in London celebrating excellence in West End theatre by the Society of West End Theatre. The awards would not become the Laurence Olivier Awards, as they are known today, until the 1984 ceremony.

== Winners and nominees ==
Details of winners (in bold) and nominees, in each award category, per the Society of London Theatre.

| Play of the Year | Musical of the Year |
|---|---|
| **Another Country by Julian Mitchell – Queen's**; 84 Charing Cross Road by Helene Hanff, adapted by James Roose-Evans – Ambassadors; Insignificance by Terry Johnson – Royal Court; Our Friends in the North by Peter Flannery – RSC at The Pit | **Poppy – RSC at the Barbican**; Andy Capp – Aldwych; Underneath the Arches – Prince of Wales; Windy City – Victoria Palace |
Comedy of the Year
**Noises Off by Michael Frayn – Savoy**; Key for Two by John Chapman and Dave Freeman – Vaudeville; Season's Greetings by Alan Ayckbourn – Apollo; Trafford Tanzi by Claire Luckham – Mermaid
| Actor of the Year in a New Play | Actress of the Year in a New Play |
| **Ian McDiarmid as Albert Einstein in Insignificance – Royal Court**; Rupert Everett as Guy Bennett in Another Country – Queen's; Alec McCowen as Adolf Hitler in The Portage to San Cristobal of A.H. – Mermaid; David Swift as Frank Doel in 84 Charing Cross Road – Ambassadors | **Rosemary Leach as The Narrator in 84 Charing Cross Road – Ambassadors**; Judy Davis as Marilyn Monroe in Insignificance – Royal Court; Judi Dench as Deborah in Other Places – National Theatre Cottesloe; Anna Massey as Xenia in Summer – National Theatre Cottesloe |
| Actor of the Year in a Revival | Actress of the Year in a Revival |
| **Stephen Moore as Torvold Helmer in A Doll's House – RSC at The Pit**; Joss Ackland as Sir John Falstaff in Henry IV – RSC at the Barbican; Trevor Peacock as Henry Horatio Hobson in Hobson's Choice – Theatre Royal Haymarket; Donald Sinden as Vanya Petrovich Voynitsky in Uncle Vanya – Theatre Royal Haymarket | **Cheryl Campbell as Nora Helmer in A Doll's House – RSC at The Pit**; Judi Dench as Lady Bracknell in The Importance of Being Earnest – National Theatre Lyttelton; Felicity Kendal as Paula Jarman in The Second Mrs Tanqueray – National Theatre Lyttelton; Mary Maddox as Belle Stark in Rocket to the Moon – Apollo |
| Actor of the Year in a Musical | Actress of the Year in a Musical |
| **Roy Hudd as Bud Flanagan in Underneath the Arches – Prince of Wales**; Tim Curry as The Pirate King in The Pirates of Penzance – Theatre Royal Drury Lane; Bob Hoskins as Nathan Detroit in Guys and Dolls – National Theatre Olivier; Stephen Moore as Jack Idle in Poppy – RSC at the Barbican | **Julia McKenzie as Miss Adelaide in Guys and Dolls – National Theatre Olivier**; Val McLane as Flo Capp in Andy Capp – Aldwych; Imelda Staunton as Lucy Lockit in The Beggar's Opera – National Theatre Cottesloe; Marti Webb as Emma in Song and Dance – Palace |
Comedy Performance of the Year
**Geoffrey Hutchings as Lady Dodo in Poppy – RSC at the Barbican**; Jane Carr as Hermia in A Midsummer Night's Dream – RSC at the Barbican; Paul Eddington as Lloyd Dallas in Noises Off – Savoy; Bill Paterson as Schweyk in Schweik in the Second World War – National Theatre Olivier
| Actor of the Year in a Supporting Role | Actress of the Year in a Supporting Role |
| **David Healy as Nicely Nicely Johnson in Guys and Dolls – National Theatre Olivier**; Geoffrey Hutchings as Nick Bottom in A Midsummer Night's Dream – RSC at the Barbican; Stephen Moore as Parolles in All's Well That Ends Well – RSC at the Barbican; Paul Rogers as Rev. Canon Chasuble in The Importance of Being Earnest – National Theatre Lyttelton | **Anna Massey as Miss Prism in The Importance of Being Earnest – National Theatre Lyttelton**; Nicola Blackman as Clara in Destry Rides Again – Donmar Warehouse; Sheila Hancock as Paulina in The Winter's Tale – RSC at the Barbican; Carole Hayman as Dull Gret in Top Girls – Royal Court |
Most Promising Newcomer of the Year in Theatre
**Kenneth Branagh as Tommy Judd in Another Country – Queen's**; Rupert Everett as Guy Bennett in Another Country – Queen's; Terry Johnson for writing Insignificance – Royal Court; Imelda Staunton as Lucy Lockit in The Beggar's Opera – National Theatre Cottesloe
Director of the Year
**Richard Eyre for Guys and Dolls – National Theatre Olivier**; Michael Bogdanov for Uncle Vanya – National Theatre Lyttelton; Adrian Noble for A Doll's House – RSC at The Pit; James Roose-Evans for 84 Charing Cross Road – Ambassadors
Designer of the Year
**John Gunter for Guys and Dolls – National Theatre Olivier**; Abd'Elkader Farrah for Poppy – RSC at the Barbican; Carl Toms for Windy City – Victoria Palace; Ultz for The Twin Rivals – RSC at The Pit
Outstanding Achievement of the Year in a Musical
**Guys and Dolls – National Theatre Olivier**; Song and Dance – Palace; The Beggar's Opera – National Theatre Cottesloe; The Pirates of Penzance – Theatre Royal Drury Lane
| Outstanding Achievement of the Year in Ballet | Outstanding First Achievement of the Year in Ballet |
| **Le songe d'une nuit d'été, Paris Opera Ballet – Royal Opera House**; Ghost Dances, Ballet Rambert – Sadler's Wells; Illuminations, The Royal Ballet – Royal Opera House; L'Invitation au voyage, The Royal Ballet – Royal Opera House | **Élisabeth Platel in La Sylphide, Paris Opera Ballet – Royal Opera House**; Alessandra Ferri in Mayerling, The Royal Ballet – Royal Opera House; Evelyn Hart in Belong, Royal Winnipeg Ballet – Sadler's Wells; Jean-Yves Lormeau in Le songe d'une nuit d'été, Paris Opera Ballet – Royal Opera House |
| Outstanding Achievement in Opera | Outstanding First Achievement of the Year in Opera |
| **Rigoletto, English National Opera – London Coliseum**; Agrippina, Kent Opera – Sadler's Wells; Falstaff, The Royal Opera – Royal Opera House; I puritani, Welsh National Opera – Dominion | **Jeffrey Tate in La clemenza di Tito, The Royal Opera – Royal Opera House**; Robert Dean in Pelléas and Mélisande, English National Opera – London Coliseum; Anne-Marie Owens in The Barber of Seville, English National Opera – London Coliseum; Lynda Russell in Partenope, Handel Opera Society – Sadler's Wells |
Society Special Award
**Charles Wintour, former editor of the Evening Standard**

== Productions with multiple nominations and awards ==
The following 17 productions, including one ballet, received multiple nominations:

- 6: Guys and Dolls
- 4: 84 Charing Cross Road, Another Country, Insignificance and Poppy
- 3: A Doll's House, The Beggar's Opera and The Importance of Being Earnest
- 2: A Midsummer Night's Dream, Andy Capp, Le songe d'une nuit d'été, Noises Off, Song and Dance, The Pirates of Penzance, Uncle Vanya, Underneath the Arches and Windy City

The following four productions received multiple awards:

- 5: Guys and Dolls
- 2: A Doll's House, Another Country and Poppy

== See also ==
- 36th Tony Awards
