= 1983 Laurence Olivier Awards =

Edition of London theatre awards

1983 Society of West End Theatre Awards

The 1983 Society of West End Theatre Awards were held in 1983 in London celebrating excellence in West End theatre by the Society of West End Theatre. The awards would not become the Laurence Olivier Awards, as they are known today, until the 1984 ceremony.

== Winners and nominees ==
Details of winners (in bold) and nominees, in each award category, per the Society of London Theatre.

Play of the Year	Musical of the Year
**Glengarry Glen Ross by David Mamet – National Theatre Cottesloe**; Pack of Lies by Hugh Whitemore – Lyric; The Slab Boys Trilogy by John Byrne – Royal Court; Tales from Hollywood by Christopher Hampton – National Theatre Olivier	**Blood Brothers – Lyric**; Bashville – Regent's Park Open Air; Little Shop of Horrors – Comedy; Snoopy – Duchess
Comedy of the Year
**Daisy Pulls It Off by Denise Deegan – Globe**; Beethoven's Tenth by Peter Ustinov – Vaudeville; Run for Your Wife by Ray Cooney – Shaftesbury; Woza Albert by Percy Mtwa, Mbongeni Ngema and Barney Simon – Criterion
Actor of the Year in a New Play	Actress of the Year in a New Play
**Jack Shepherd as Richard Roma in Glengarry Glen Ross – National Theatre Cottesloe**; Michael Gambon as Ödön von Horváth in Tales from Hollywood – National Theatre Olivier; Ben Kingsley as Edmund Kean in Kean – Theatre Royal Haymarket; Michael Williams as Bob Jackson in Pack of Lies – Lyric	**Judi Dench as Barbara Jackson in Pack of Lies – Lyric**; Sara Kestelman as Zenocia in The Custom of the Country – RSC at The Pit; Maureen Lipman as Rachel in Messiah – Aldwych; Janet Suzman as Nina in Cowardice – Ambassadors
Actor of the Year in a Revival	Actress of the Year in a Revival
**Derek Jacobi as Cyrano de Bergerac in Cyrano de Bergerac – RSC at the Barbican**; Alan Bates as Alfred Redl in A Patriot for Me – Theatre Royal Haymarket; Rex Harrison as Captain Shotover in Heartbreak House – Theatre Royal Haymarket; Bob Peck as Lear in King Lear – RSC at the Barbican	**Frances de la Tour as Josie in A Moon for the Misbegotten – Mermaid**; Sinéad Cusack as Kate Minola in The Taming of the Shrew – RSC at the Barbican; Rosemary Harris as Hesione Hushabye in Heartbreak House – Theatre Royal Haymarket; Helen Mirren as Cleopatra in Antony and Cleopatra – RSC at The Pit
Actor of the Year in a Musical	Actress of the Year in a Musical
**Denis Lawson as Jim Lancaster in Mr Cinders – Fortune**; George Costigan as Mickey in Blood Brothers – Lyric; Teddy Kempner as Snoopy in Snoopy – Duchess; Peter Woodward as Cashel Byron in Bashville – Regent's Park Open Air	**Barbara Dickson as Mrs. Johnstone in Blood Brothers – Lyric**; Ellen Greene as Audrey in Little Shop of Horrors – Comedy; Stephanie Lawrence as Marilyn Monroe in Marilyn – Adelphi; Sarah Payne as Lina Lamont in Singin' in the Rain – London Palladium
Comedy Performance of the Year
**Griff Rhys Jones as Lord Fancourt Babberley in Charley's Aunt – Aldwych**; Susan Colverd as Lady Brute in The Provok'd Wife – Donmar Warehouse; Michael Hordern as Sir Anthony Absolute in The Rivals – National Theatre Olivier; Peter Ustinov as Ludwig van Beethoven in Beethoven's Tenth – Vaudeville
Actor of the Year in a Supporting Role	Actress of the Year in a Supporting Role
**Alan Devlin as Phil Hogan in A Moon for the Misbegotten – Mermaid**; Ian McDiarmid as Bertolt Brecht in Tales from Hollywood – National Theatre Olivier; Mark Rylance as Michael in Arden of Faversham – RSC at The Pit; Antony Sher as The Fool in King Lear – RSC at the Barbican	**Abigail McKern as Celia in As You Like It – Regent's Park Open Air**; Kate Buffery as Clare Beaumont in Daisy Pulls It Off – Globe; Sylvia Coleridge as Em in Clay – RSC at the Barbican Pit; Barbara Leigh-Hunt as Helen Kroger in Pack of Lies – Lyric
Most Promising Newcomer of the Year in Theatre
**John Retallack for directing Quixote and The Provok'd Wife – Donmar Warehouse**; Arturo Brachetti for conceiving and performing in Y – Piccadilly; Billy McColl as Phil McCann in The Slab Boys Trilogy – Royal Court; Abigail McKern as Celia in As You Like It – Regent's Park Open Air
Director of the Year
**Terry Hands for Cyrano de Bergerac – RSC at the Barbican**; Bill Bryden for A Midsummer Night's Dream – National Theatre Cottesloe; Barry Kyle for The Taming of the Shrew – RSC at the Barbican; Peter Wood for The Rivals – National Theatre Olivier
Designer of the Year
**Ralph Koltai for Cyrano de Bergerac – RSC at the Barbican**; John Gunter for The Rivals – National Theatre Olivier; John Napier for Peter Pan – RSC at the Barbican; Carl Toms for The Real Thing – Strand
Outstanding Individual Performance of the Year in a New Dance Production	Outstanding New Dance Production of the Year
**Alessandra Ferri in Valley of Shadows, The Royal Ballet – Royal Opera House**; Patrick Armand in Songs of a Wayfarer, Ballet Théâtre Francais – London Coliseum; Natalia Makarova in The Nightingale, The Royal Opera – Royal Opera House; Koen Onzia in The Seasons, London Festival Ballet – London Coliseum	**Requiem, The Royal Ballet – Royal Opera House**; Glass Pieces, New York City Ballet – Royal Opera House; Nijinsky the Fool, Lindsay Kemp Company; The Nightingale, The Royal Opera – Royal Opera House
Outstanding Individual Performance of the Year in a New Opera Production	Outstanding New Opera Production of the Year
**Valerie Masterson in Semele, The Royal Opera – Royal Opera House**; Graham Clark in The Gambler, English National Opera – London Coliseum; Eilene Hannan in Rusalka, English National Opera – London Coliseum; Nelly Miriciouiu in Manon Lescaut, Scottish Opera	**Il matrimonio segreto, Cologne Opera**; Boris Godunov, The Royal Opera – Royal Opera House; Manon Lescaut, Scottish Opera; Rienzi, English National Opera – London Coliseum
Society Special Award
**Joan Littlewood**

== Productions with multiple nominations and awards ==
The following 20 productions, including one ballet and one opera, received multiple nominations:

- 4: Pack of Lies
- 3: Blood Brothers, Cyrano de Bergerac, Tales from Hollywood and The Rivals
- 2: A Moon for the Misbegotten, As You Like It, Bashville, Beethoven's Tenth, Daisy Pulls It Off, Glengarry Glen Ross, Heartbreak House, King Lear, Little Shop of Horrors, Manon Lescaut, Snoopy, The Nightingale, The Provok'd Wife, The Slab Boys Trilogy and The Taming of the Shrew

The following four productions received multiple awards:

- 3: Cyrano de Bergerac
- 2: A Moon for the Misbegotten, Blood Brothers and Glengarry Glen Ross

== See also ==
- 37th Tony Awards
