= 1978 Laurence Olivier Awards =

Edition of London theatre awards

1978 Society of West End Theatre Awards

The 1978 Society of West End Theatre Awards were held in 1978 in London celebrating excellence in West End theatre by the Society of West End Theatre. The awards would not become the Laurence Olivier Awards, as they are known today, until the 1984 ceremony.

== Winners and nominees ==
Details of winners (in bold) and nominees, in each award category, per the Society of London Theatre.

Play of the Year	Musical of the Year
**Whose Life Is It Anyway by Brian Clark – Mermaid / Savoy**; Half-Life by Julian Mitchell – National Theatre; Lark Rise by Flora Thompson, adapted by Keith Dewhurst – National Theatre; Plenty by David Hare – National Theatre	**Evita – Prince Edward**; Annie – Victoria Palace; Elvis – Prince Edward
Comedy of the Year
**Filumena by Eduardo De Filippo, adapted by Willis Hall / Keith Waterhouse – Lyric**; Shut Your Eyes and Think of England by John Chapman / Anthony Marriott – Apollo; Ten Times Table by Alan Ayckbourn – Globe
Actor of the Year in a New Play	Actress of the Year in a New Play
**Tom Conti as Ken Harrison in Whose Life Is It Anyway – Mermaid / Savoy**; Gordon Chater as Robert O'Brien in The Elocution of Benjamin Franklin – Mayfair; John Gielgud as Sir Noel Cunliffe in Half-Life – National Theatre; Peter McEnery as Albie Sachs in The Jail Diary of Albie Sachs – RSC at the Warehouse	**Joan Plowright as Filumena Marturano in Filumena – Lyric**; Yvonne Bryceland as Hecuba in The Woman – National Theatre; Sylvia Miles as Mrs. Wire in Vieux Carré – Piccadilly; Kate Nelligan as Susan Traherne in Plenty – National Theatre
Actor of the Year in a Revival	Actress of the Year in a Revival
**Alan Howard as Coriolanus in Coriolanus – RSC at the Aldwych**; Derek Jacobi as Nikolai Ivanov in Ivanov – Old Vic; Timothy West as Max in The Homecoming – Garrick; Nicol Williamson as Bill Maitland in Inadmissible Evidence – Royal Court	**Dorothy Tutin as Lady Plyant in The Double Dealer – National Theatre**; Eileen Atkins as Viola in Twelfth Night – Old Vic; Ingrid Bergman as Helen Lancaster in Waters of the Moon – Theatre Royal, Haymarket; Wendy Hiller as Mrs. Whyte in Waters of the Moon – Theatre Royal, Haymarket
Performance of the Year in a Musical	Comedy Performance of the Year
**Elaine Paige as Eva Perón in Evita – Prince Edward**; David Essex as Che in Evita – Prince Edward; Roy Hudd as Fagin in Oliver! – Albery; Stratford Johns as Daddy Oliver Warbucks in Annie – Victoria Palace	**Ian McKellen as Face/Jeremy in The Alchemist – RSC at the Aldwych**; Sheila Hancock as Miss Agatha Hannigan in Annie – Victoria Palace; Geraldine McEwan as Lulu in Look after Lulu – Theatre Royal, Haymarket; Donald Sinden as Performer in Shut Your Eyes and Think of England – Apollo
Actor of the Year in a Supporting Role	Actress of the Year in a Supporting Role
**Robert Eddison as Sir Andrew Aguecheek and Feste in Twelfth Night – Old Vic**; Michael Bryant as Sir Paul Plyant in The Double Dealer – National Theatre; Julian Glover as Tullus Aufidius in Coriolanus – RSC at the Aldwych; Robert Stephens as Mayor in Brand – National Theatre	**Elizabeth Spriggs as Sonia Marsden in Love Letters on Blue Paper – National Theatre**; Brenda Bruce as Alizon Eliot in The Lady's Not for Burning – Old Vic; Susan Fleetwood as Ismene in The Woman – National Theatre; Patricia Hayes as Rosalia Solimene in Filumena – National Theatre
Director of the Year
**Terry Hands for Henry VI – RSC at the Aldwych**; Bill Bryden and Sebastian Graham-Jones for Lark Rise – National Theatre; Christopher Morahan for The Philanderer – National Theatre; Harold Prince for Evita – Prince Edward
Designer of the Year
**Ralph Koltai for Brand – National Theatre**; Eileen Diss for The Homecoming – Garrick; Abd'Elkader Farrah for Henry VI – RSC at the Aldwych; Tanya Moiseiwitsch for The Double Dealer – National Theatre
Outstanding Achievement of the Year in Ballet	Production of the Year in Ballet
**Robert Cohan for artistic directing, London Contemporary Dance Theatre – Sadler's Wells**; Christopher Bruce for choreographing for Ballet Rambert – Sadler's Wells; Siobhan Davies in Harmonica Breakdown – Sadler's Wells; Lynn Seymour in A Month in the Country, The Royal Ballet – Royal Opera House	**A Month in the Country, The Royal Ballet – Royal Opera House**; People Alone, London Contemporary Dance Theatre – Sadler's Wells; Praeludium, Ballet Rambert – Sadler's Wells; Song of the Earth, Stuttgart Ballet – London Coliseum
Outstanding Achievement in Opera	Production of the Year in Opera
**English National Opera for their enterprising repertoire – London Coliseum**; Colin Davis for music directing, The Royal Opera – Royal Opera House	**Lohengrin, The Royal Opera – Royal Opera House**; La fanciulla del West, The Royal Opera – Royal Opera House; Luisa Miller, The Royal Opera – Royal Opera House; The Seven Deadly Sins, English National Opera – London Coliseum

== Productions with multiple nominations and awards ==
The following 16 productions received multiple nominations:

- 4: Evita
- 3: Annie, Filumena and The Double Dealer
- 2: Brand, Coriolanus, Half-Life, Henry VI, Lark Rise, Plenty, Shut Your Eyes and Think of England, The Homecoming, The Woman, Twelfth Night, Waters of the Moon and Whose Life Is It Anyway

The following three productions received multiple awards:

- 2: Evita, Filumena and Whose Life Is It Anyway

== See also ==
- 32nd Tony Awards
