= 1984 Laurence Olivier Awards =

Edition of London theatre awards

- Date: 8 December 1984
- Location: Theatre Royal, Drury Lane, London

Television/radio coverage
- Network: BBC Television

The 1984 Laurence Olivier Awards were presented by the Society of London Theatre on 8 December 1984 at the Theatre Royal, Drury Lane in London, celebrating excellence in West End theatre. It was broadcast by BBC Television, though the broadcast date and specific BBC station is not available – the 2003 Oliviers, for example, aired on BBC Two the evening after the live event.

After the first eight years (1976–1983) as the Society of West End Theatre Awards, these were the first awards to be held after Laurence Olivier consented to the awards being renamed in his honour.

== Winners and nominees ==
Details of winners (in bold) and nominees, in each award category, per the Society of London Theatre.

Play of the Year	Musical of the Year
**Benefactors by Michael Frayn – Vaudeville**; Master Harold and the Boys by Athol Fugard – National Theatre Cottesloe; Poppie Nongena by Elsa Joubert and Sandra Kotze, adapted by Hilary Blecher – Donmar Warehouse; Rat in the Skull by Ron Hutchinson – Royal Court	**42nd Street – Theatre Royal Drury Lane**; Pump Boys and Dinettes – Piccadilly; Starlight Express – Apollo Victoria; The Hired Man – Astoria
Comedy of the Year
**Up 'n' Under by John Godber – Donmar Warehouse**; Gymslip Vicar by Cliff Hanger – Donmar Warehouse; Intimate Exchanges by Alan Ayckbourn – Ambassadors; Two into One by Ray Cooney – Shaftesbury
Actor of the Year in a New Play	Actress of the Year in a New Play
**Brian Cox as Detective Inspector Nelson in Rat in the Skull – Royal Court**; Ian Charleson as Eddie in Fool for Love – National Theatre Cottesloe; John Kani as Willie in Master Harold and the Boys – National Theatre Cottesloe; Michael Pennington as Strider in Strider: The Story of a Horse – National Theatre Cottesloe	**Thuli Dumakude as Poppie Nongena in Poppie Nongena – Donmar Warehouse**; Brenda Blethyn as Sheila in Benefactors – Vaudeville; Julie Covington as Vivienne Haigh-Wood Eliot in Tom and Viv – Royal Court; Julie Walters as May in Fool for Love – National Theatre Cottesloe
Actor of the Year in a Revival	Actress of the Year in a Revival
**Ian McKellen as Mikhail Platonov in Wild Honey – National Theatre Lyttelton**; Miles Anderson as Sigismund in Life Is a Dream – RSC at The Pit; Emrys James as Sir Giles Overreach in A New Way to Pay Old Debts – RSC at the Barbican Pit; Peter McEnery as Baron De Laubardemont in The Devils – RSC at the Barbican Pit	**Vanessa Redgrave as Miss Tina in The Aspern Papers – Theatre Royal Haymarket**; Glenda Jackson as Nina Leeds in Strange Interlude – Duke of York's; Juliet Stevenson as Isabella in Measure for Measure – RSC at the Barbican; Zoë Wanamaker as Viola in Twelfth Night – RSC at the Barbican
Actor of the Year in a Musical	Actress of the Year in a Musical
**Paul Clarkson as John Tallentire in The Hired Man – Astoria**; Tim Flavin as Phil "Junior" Dolan III in On Your Toes – Palace; David Kernan as The Lord Chancellor in The Ratepayers' Iolanthe – Phoenix; Lon Satton as Rambling Poppa McCoy in Starlight Express – Apollo Victoria	**Natalia Makarova as Vera Barnova in On Your Toes – Palace**; Julia Hills as Emily Tallentire in The Hired Man – Astoria; Clare Leach as Peggy Sawyer in 42nd Street – Theatre Royal Drury Lane; Sheila White as Belle Poitrine in Little Me – Prince of Wales
Comedy Performance of the Year
**Maureen Lipman as Miss Skillon in See How They Run – Shaftesbury**; Lavinia Bertram as Various in Intimate Exchanges – Ambassadors; Leonard Rossiter as Inspector Truscott in Loot – Ambassadors; Michael Williams as George in Two into One – Shaftesbury
Actor of the Year in a Supporting Role	Actress of the Year in a Supporting Role
**Edward Petherbridge as Charles Marsden in Strange Interlude – Duke of York's**; Ramolao Makhene as Sam in Master Harold and the Boys – National Theatre Cottesloe; Richard O'Callaghan as Feste in Twelfth Night – RSC at the Barbican; Timothy Spall Dauphin Charles in Saint Joan – National Theatre Olivier	**Marcia Warren as Vera in Stepping Out – Duke of York's**; Clare Higgins as Stella Kowalski in A Streetcar Named Desire – Mermaid; Sophia Mgcina as Poppie's Mother in Poppie Nongena – RSC at the Barbican Pit; Zoë Wanamaker as Kitty Duval in The Time of Your Life – Lyric
Most Promising Newcomer of the Year in Theatre
**Tim Flavin as Phil "Junior" Dolan III in On Your Toes – Palace**; Hilary Blecher, Elsa Joubert and Sandra Kotze for adapting, conceiving and directing Poppie Nongena – Donmar Warehouse; Henry Goodman as Dromio of Ephesus in The Comedy of Errors – RSC at the Barbican; Clare Leach as Peggy Sawyer in 42nd Street – Theatre Royal Drury Lane
Director of the Year
**Christopher Morahan for Wild Honey – National Theatre Lyttelton**; John Barton for Life Is a Dream – RSC at the Barbican Pit; Michael Blakemore for Benefactors – Vaudeville; Adrian Noble for The Comedy of Errors – RSC at the Barbican
Designer of the Year
**John Gunter for Wild Honey – National Theatre Lyttelton**; Voytek Dolinski and Michael Levine for Strange Interlude – Duke of York's; John Napier for Starlight Express – Apollo Victoria; Carl Toms for The Aspern Papers – Theatre Royal Haymarket
Outstanding Achievement of the Year in a Musical
**Ned Sherrin for conceiving The Ratepayers' Iolanthe – Phoenix**; Howard Goodall for scoring The Hired Man – Astoria; John Napier for set designing Starlight Express – Apollo Victoria; Starlight Express for the overall impact of the production – Apollo Victoria
Outstanding Individual Performance of the Year in a New Dance Production	Outstanding New Dance Production of the Year
**David Bintley in Petrushka, Sadler's Wells Royal Ballet – Sadler's Wells**; Wayne Eagling in Different Drummer, The Royal Ballet – Royal Opera House; Patricia Ruanne in Onegin, London Festival Ballet – London Coliseum	**Giselle, Dance Theatre of Harlem – London Coliseum**; Consort Lessons, The Royal Ballet – Royal Opera House; Intimate Pages, Ballet Rambert – Sadler's Wells; Metamorphosis, Sadler's Wells Royal Ballet – Sadler's Wells
Outstanding Individual Performance of the Year in a New Opera Production	Outstanding New Opera Production of the Year
**Philip Langridge in Osud, English National Opera – London Coliseum**; Edita Gruberová in I Capuleti e i Montecchi, The Royal Opera – Royal Opera House; Valerie Masterson in Mireille, English National Opera – London Coliseum; Rosalind Plowright in Sicilian Vespers, English National Opera – London Coliseum	**From the House of the Dead, Welsh National Opera**; La Calisto, London Sinfonietta and Opera Factory; Sicilian Vespers, English National Opera – London Coliseum; The Rape of Lucretia, English National Opera – London Coliseum
Society Special Award
**Arnold Goodman**

== Productions with multiple nominations and awards ==
The following 18 productions, including one opera, received multiple nominations:

- 5: Starlight Express
- 4: Poppie Nongena, The Hired Man
- 3: 42nd Street, Benefactors, Master Harold and the Boys, On Your Toes, Strange Interlude and Wild Honey
- 2: Fool for Love, Intimate Exchanges, Life Is a Dream, Rat in the Skull, Sicilian Vespers, The Aspern Papers, The Comedy of Errors, The Ratepayers' Iolanthe, Twelfth Night and Two into One

The following two productions received multiple awards:

- 3: Wild Honey
- 2: On Your Toes

== See also ==
- 38th Tony Awards
