= Michael Bryant (actor) =

British actor (1928–2002)

Michael Bryant CBE
- Born: 5 April 1928; London, England
- Died: 25 April 2002 (aged 74); London, England
- Occupation: Actor
- Years active: 1954–2000
- Spouses: Josephine Martin (m. 1958; div. 1980); Judith Coke (m. 1990)
- Children: 4

Michael Dennis Bryant CBE (5 April 1928 – 25 April 2002) was a British stage and television actor. An eight-time Olivier Award nominee, Bryant won three. He was also a three-time British Academy Television Award nominee for Best Actor.

== Biography ==
Bryant attended Battersea Grammar School and, after service in the Merchant Navy and the Army, attended drama school and appeared in many productions on the London stage. He made his film debut in 1955. He had a role as Mathieu in the BBC2 serial The Roads to Freedom, a 1970 adaptation of Jean-Paul Sartre's trilogy of the same name. His guest star appearance as Wing Commander Marsh, who feigns insanity in the 'Tweedledum' episode of the BBC drama series Colditz (1972), is still widely remembered.

Bryant was chosen by Orson Welles to play the lead role in The Deep, Welles's adaptation of the Charles Williams novel Dead Calm. The production frequently ran out of money, and following the death of actor Laurence Harvey in 1973, Welles stopped production and announced that the movie – which had been completed except for one special effects shot of a ship exploding – would not be released. (The novel was finally adapted to film in 1989.)

In 1969 Bryant took his love of the stage on a strange trip into the realm of cult films, playing a clever male prostitute who outwits a delusional family of killers in the dark comedy Mumsy, Nanny, Sonny and Girly, an adaptation of a play by Maisie Mosco. Due to poor marketing and a lack of faith in the project by the distributor, the film quickly sank into obscurity.

One of Bryant's most memorable performances was in the BBC television play The Stone Tape (1972), in which he plays the leader of a team of scientists who investigate ghost sightings in a brooding Gothic mansion. Equally memorable is his later performance in an adaptation of M. R. James's The Treasure of Abbot Thomas (1974).

Bryant also had a supporting role as a psychiatrist in the black comedy The Ruling Class, with Peter O'Toole and Alastair Sim. He also appeared in Richard Attenborough's Gandhi (1982) as a British diplomat.

Having played Vladimir Lenin in the film Nicholas and Alexandra, Bryant later reprised the role in Robert Bolt's play State of Revolution (1977), having previously co-starred in Bolt's unsuccessful Gentle Jack. State of Revolution was significant for featuring the first role that Bryant performed at the National Theatre, where he went on to be a constant presence for a quarter of a century. Described by Michael Billington as a "rock-solid company man", he had earlier performed with the Royal Shakespeare Company from 1964, including the premiere production of Harold Pinter's The Homecoming (1965), in which he played Teddy, the returning academic.

In 1980, Bryant won the London Drama Critics Circle Theatre Award for Best Actor, and his other theatrical performances were equally well-thought-of. He won Laurence Olivier Awards in 1988 and 1990 and was nominated twice more.

== Filmography ==
Year	Title	Role	Notes
1955	Passage Home	Stebbings	
1956	Jesus of Nazareth	John	
1956	Uranium Boom		
1958	A Night to Remember	Sixth Officer James Moody	
1962	Life for Ruth	John's counsel	
1963	The Mind Benders	Dr. Danny Tate	
1966	The Deadly Affair	Gaveston	Uncredited
1967	Torture Garden	Colin Williams	(segment 1, "Enoch")
1969	Goodbye, Mr. Chips	Max Staefel	
1970	Mumsy, Nanny, Sonny and Girly	New Friend	
1970	The Deep	John Ingram	
1971	Nicholas and Alexandra	Vladimir Lenin	
1972	The Ruling Class	Dr. Herder	
1974	Fall of Eagles	Rachkovsky	
1974	Caravan to Vaccares (film)	Zuger	
1982	Gandhi	Principal Secretary	
1984	Sakharov	Syshchikov	
1992	Bikini Summer II	Sammy	
1996	Hamlet	Priest	
2000	The Miracle Maker	God / The Doctor	Voice (final film role)

== Stage credits ==
This table contains selected known professional theatrical roles for Bryant.

Production	Date	Theatre (London, unless otherwise noted)	Role	Notes
The Homecoming	June 1965	Aldwych Theatre	Teddy	
The Return of A.J.Raffles	December 1975	Aldwych Theatre	Captain von Blixen	
State of Revolution	May 1977	Lyttleton Theatre	Vladimir Lenin	
Brand	April 1978	Olivier Theatre	Pastor Brand	
Strife	November 1978	Olivier Theatre	David Roberts	
As You Like It	July 1979	Olivier Theatre	Jacques	
The Wild Duck	December 1979	Olivier Theatre	Gregers Werle	
Othello	March 1980	Olivier Theatre	Iago	
The Mayor of Zalamea	August 1981	Cottesloe Theatre	Pedro Crespo	
Uncle Vanya	May 1982	Lyttleton Theatre	Vanya	
The Ancient Mariner	October 1984	Olivier Theatre	Ancient Mariner	
Love for Love	November 1985	Lyttleton Theatre	Sir Sampson Legend	
The American Clock	July 1986	Cottesloe Theatre	Moe Baum	
King Lear	December 1986	Olivier Theatre	Earl of Gloucester	
Antony and Cleopatra	April 1987	Olivier Theatre	Enobarbus	
The Tempest	April 1988	Cottesloe Theatre	Prospero	
Hamlet	March 1989	Olivier Theatre	Polonius	
The Voysey Inheritance	June 1989	Cottlesloe Theatre	Peacey	
Racing Demon	February 1990	Cottesloe Theatre	Reverend Henderson	
The Crucible	May 1990	Olivier Theatre	Giles Corey	
The Wind in the Willows	December 1990	Olivier Theatre	Badger	
Pygmalion	April 1992	Olivier Theatre	Alfred Doolittle	
Richard II	May 1995	Cottesloe Theatre	Duke of York	
John Gabriel Borkman	July 1996	Lyttleton Theatre	Vilhelm Foldal	
King Lear	March 1997	Cottesloe Theatre	Fool	
The Invention of Love	September 1997	Cottesloe Theatre	Charon	
Money	May 1999	Olivier Theatre	Old Member	
Summerfolk	August 1999	Olivier Theatre	Semyon Dvoetochie	
The Cherry Orchard	September 2000	Cottesloe Theatre	Firs	

== Awards and nominations ==
Year	Awards	Category	Nominated work	Result	Ref.
1971	British Academy Television Awards	Best Actor	The Roads to Freedom (TV serial)	Nominated	
1973	British Academy Television Awards	Best Actor	Stage 2: The Duchess of Malfi / Colditz	Nominated	
1975	British Academy Television Awards	Best Actor	ITV Playhouse: Mr Axelford's Angel	Nominated	
1977	Laurence Olivier Awards	Actor of the Year in a New Play	State of Revolution	Won	
1978	Laurence Olivier Awards	Best Actor in a Supporting Role	The Double Dealer	Nominated	
1979	Laurence Olivier Awards	Actor of the Year in a Revival	Strife	Nominated	
1979	Laurence Olivier Awards	Best Actor in a Supporting Role	Undiscovered Country	Nominated	
1987	Laurence Olivier Awards	Best Performance in a Supporting Role	King Lear / Antony and Cleopatra	Won	
1990	Laurence Olivier Awards	Best Performance in a Supporting Role	Hamlet / The Voysey Inheritance / Racing Demon	Won	
1998	Laurence Olivier Awards	Best Performance in a Supporting Role	King Lear	Nominated	
2000	Laurence Olivier Awards	Best Actor in a Supporting Role	Summerfolk	Nominated	
