= The Fire that Consumes =

Play by Henry de Montherlant

The Fire that Consumes La Ville dont le Prince est un enfant
- Original language: French
- Written by: Henry de Montherlant; Vivian A. Cox; Bernard Miles
- Subject: a Roman Catholic priest is obsessed with one of the boys
- Genre: Drama
- Setting: a Catholic boys' school pre-WWII

Premiere
- Place: Mermaid Theatre; London, England

The Fire that Consumes is an English translation of the 1955 play by French dramatist Henry de Montherlant, La Ville dont le Prince est un enfant. The play was translated by Vivian Cox with Bernard Miles, and staged at the London West End Mermaid Theatre in 1977 with Nigel Hawthorne and Dai Bradley in the key roles. The title, literally translated, The City Whose Prince is a Child, is taken from Ecclesiastes 10:16: "Woe to thee, O land, when thy king is a child, and thy princes eat in the morning!"

== Summary ==
The Abbé de Pradts, a Roman Catholic priest, becomes obsessed with a junior pupil named Souplier. When Souplier forms a relationship with a fellow student, the jealous priest vies for his attention, yielding tragic results.

== Awards and nominations ==
Awards

- 1977 Laurence Olivier Award for Best New Play
- 1977 Society of West End Theatre Award for Play of the Year
