= 1976 Laurence Olivier Awards =

Edition of London theatre awards

1976 Society of West End Theatre Awards
- Date: December 1976
- Location: Café Royal

The 1976 Society of West End Theatre Awards were held in December 1976, at the Café Royal in London. They were the first major award ceremony celebrating excellence in West End theatre from the Society of West End Theatre, which would change its name to the Society of London Theatre in 1984 – the same year the awards would be renamed the Laurence Olivier Awards.

== Winners and nominees ==
Details of winners (in bold) and nominees, in each award category, per the Society of London Theatre.

Play of the Year	Musical of the Year
**Dear Daddy by Denis Cannan – Ambassadors**; For King and Country by John Wilson – Mermaid; Funny Peculiar by Mike Stott – Garrick; Old World by Aleksei Arbuzov, adapted by Ariadne Nicolaeff – RSC at the Aldwych	**A Chorus Line – Theatre Royal, Drury Lane**; Ipi Tombi – Her Majesty's; Side by Side by Sondheim – Wyndham's; Very Good Eddie – Piccadilly
Comedy of the Year
**Donkeys' Years by Michael Frayn – Globe**; The Bed Before Yesterday by Ben Travers – Lyric; Confusions by Alan Ayckbourn – Apollo; Funny Peculiar by Mike Stott – Garrick
Actor of the Year in a New Play	Actress of the Year in a New Play
**Paul Copley as Private Hamp in For King and Country – Mermaid**; Richard Beckinsale as Trevor Tinsley in Funny Peculiar – Garrick; Frank Finlay as Ben Prosser in Watch It Come Down and as Josef Frank in Weapons of Happiness – National Theatre; Alec McCowen as Ben Musgrave in The Family Dance – Criterion	**Peggy Ashcroft as Lidya Vasilyevna in Old World – RSC at the Aldwych**; Pauline Collins as Belinda Trehern in Engaged – National Theatre; Penelope Keith as Lady Driver in Donkeys' Years – Globe; Joan Plowright as Alma in The Bed Before Yesterday – Lyric
Actor of the Year in a Revival	Actress of the Year in a Revival
**Alan Howard as Prince Hal/King Henry V in Henry IV and Henry V – RSC at the Aldwych**; Tom Conti as Don Juan in Don Juan and as Dick Dudgeon in The Devil's Disciple – RSC at the Aldwych; Albert Finney as Prince Hamlet in Hamlet and as Tamburlaine in Tamburlaine the Great – National Theatre; Emrys James as King Henry IV in Henry IV and as Chorus Henry V – RSC at the Aldwych	**Dorothy Tutin as Natalya Petrovna in A Month in the Country – Albery**; Susan Fleetwood as Ophelia in Hamlet, as Zenocrate in Tamburlaine the Great and as Margaret Flaherty in The Playboy of the Western World – National Theatre; Geraldine McEwan as Maria Wislack in On Approval – Theatre Royal Haymarket; Googie Withers as Lady Chiltern in An Ideal Husband and as Madame Lyubov Andreievna Ranevskaya in The Cherry Orchard
Comedy Performance of the Year
**Penelope Keith as Lady Driver in Donkeys' Years – Globe**; Peter Barkworth as Edward VIII in Crown Matrimonial – Theatre Royal Haymarket; Richard Beckinsale as Trevor Tinsley in Funny Peculiar – Garrick; Geraldine McEwan as Performer in Oh, Coward! – Criterion
Supporting Artist of the Year
**Margaret Courtenay as Mrs Railton-Bell in Separate Tables – Apollo**; Bill Fraser as The Photographer in M. Perrichon's Travels, as Lord Porteous in The Circle, as Admiral Lord Radstock in The Fool and as Sir Toby Belch in Twelfth Night – Theatre Royal Haymarket; Trevor Peacock as Ned Poins in Henry IV and as Sir Hugh Evans in The Merry Wives of Windsor – RSC at the Aldwych; André van Gyseghem as Baron Tito Belcredi in Henry IV and as Polonius in Hamlet – RSC at the Aldwych
Director of the Year
**Jonathan Miller for Three Sisters – Cambridge**; Alan Ayckbourn for Confusions, Shakespeare's People and Yahoo – Apollo; Buzz Goodbody for King Lear and Occupations; Terry Hands for Old World, Henry IV and Henry V – RSC at the Aldwych
Designer of the Year
**Abd'Elkader Farrah for Henry IV and Henry V – RSC at the Aldwych**; Eileen Diss for The Family Dance – Criterion; Ralph Koltai for Old World and Wild Oats – RSC at the Aldwych; Alan Tagg for Confusions – Apollo, Donkeys' Years – Globe and Same Time, Next Year – Prince of Wales
Society Special Award
**Save London's Theatres Campaign**

== Productions with multiple nominations and awards ==
The following 12 productions received multiple nominations:

- 6: Henry IV
- 5: Henry V
- 4: Donkeys' Years, Funny Peculiar and Old World
- 3: Confusions and Hamlet
- 2: For King and Country, Tamburlaine the Great, The Bed Before Yesterday and The Family Dance

The following three productions received multiple awards:

- 2: Donkeys' Years, Henry IV and Henry V

== See also ==
- 30th Tony Awards
