= Undiscovered Country =

Undiscovered Country is a 1979 Tom Stoppard play first produced at the Olivier Theatre in London. The play is an adaptation of Das weite Land by the Austrian playwright Arthur Schnitzler, which focuses on 1890s Viennese society, demonstrating the effects of upper class codes of behavior on human relationships. The main character is a self-made businessman named Friedrich Hofreiter who manages to be both charming and chauvinistic. Stoppard's alterations to the play consist of adding humor while lessening the melodrama. The title of the play is a reference to the concept of the afterlife as the "undiscovered country" from the "To be, or not to be" soliloquy in Hamlet.
