= 1985 Laurence Olivier Awards =

Edition of London theatre awards

The 1985 Laurence Olivier Awards were presented by the Society of London Theatre in 1985 at the Dominion Theatre in London, celebrating excellence in West End theatre. It was broadcast by BBC Television, though the broadcast date and specific BBC station is not available – the 2003 Oliviers, for example, aired on BBC Two the evening after the live event.

== Winners and nominees ==
Details of winners (in bold) and nominees, in each award category, per the Society of London Theatre.

Play of the Year	Musical of the Year
**Red Noses by Peter Barnes – RSC at the Barbican**; Doomsday by Tony Harrison – National Theatre Cottesloe; The Road to Mecca by Athol Fugard – National Theatre Lyttelton; Torch Song Trilogy by Harvey Fierstein – Albery	**Me and My Girl – Adelphi**; Les Misérables – RSC at the Barbican
Comedy of the Year
**A Chorus of Disapproval by Alan Ayckbourn – National Theatre Olivier**; Bouncers by John Godber – Donmar Warehouse; Love's Labour's Lost by William Shakespeare – RSC at the Barbican; Pravda by Howard Brenton and David Hare – National Theatre Olivier
Actor of the Year	Actress of the Year
**Antony Sher as Richard in Richard III – RSC at the Barbican and as Arnold Beckoff in Torch Song Trilogy – Albery**; Alun Armstrong as John Proctor in The Crucible and as King Leontes in The Winter's Tale – Christ Church, Spitalfields; Kenneth Branagh as King Henry V in Henry V – RSC at the Barbican; Anthony Hopkins as Lambert Le Roux in Pravda – National Theatre Olivier	**Yvonne Bryceland as Miss Helen in The Road to Mecca – National Theatre Lyttelton**; Wendy Morgan as Martine in Martine – National Theatre Lyttelton; Harriet Walter as Skinner in The Castle – RSC at The Pit; Joanne Whalley as Pam in Saved – Royal Court
Outstanding Performance of the Year by an Actor in a Musical	Outstanding Performance of the Year by an Actress in a Musical
**Robert Lindsay as Bill Snibson in Me and My Girl – Adelphi**; Alun Armstrong as M. Thénardier in Les Misérables – RSC at the Barbican; Mark McGann as John Lennon in Lennon – Astoria; Colm Wilkinson as Jean Valjean in Les Misérables – RSC at the Barbican	**Patti LuPone as Fantine in Les Misérables – RSC at the Barbican and as Moll in The Cradle Will Rock – Old Vic**; Betsy Brantley as Miss Adelaide in Guys and Dolls – Prince of Wales; Carol Sloman as Performer in Lennon – Astoria; Elisabeth Welch as Performer in Kern Goes to Hollywood – Donmar Warehouse
Comedy Performance of the Year
**Michael Gambon as Dafydd Llewellyn in A Chorus of Disapproval – National Theatre Olivier**; Roger Rees as Lord Berowne in Love's Labour's Lost – RSC at the Barbican; Griff Rhys Jones as Gianni Agnelli and Antonio Berardi in Trumpets and Raspberries – Phoenix; Maggie Smith as Mrs. Millamant in The Way of the World – Theatre Royal Haymarket
Outstanding Performance of the Year in a Supporting Role	Most Promising Newcomer of the Year in Theatre
**Imelda Staunton as Hannah Llewellyn in A Chorus of Disapproval – National Theatre Olivier and as Bessie Watty in The Corn Is Green – Old Vic**; Maria Aitken as Frances Trebell in Waste – RSC at The Pit; Patricia Routledge as Queen Margaret in Richard III – RSC at the Barbican; Zoe Wanamaker as Mother Courage in Mother Courage and Her Children – RSC at the Barbican	**Cheek by Jowl for Andromache, Pericles and Vanity Fair – Donmar Warehouse**; Frances Barber as Marguerite Gautier in Camille – Comedy; Druid Theatre Company for The Playboy of the Western World – Donmar Warehouse; Clive Mantle as Lennie Small in Of Mice and Men – Mermaid
Director of the Year
**Bill Bryden for The Mysteries – National Theatre Cottesloe**; Bill Alexander for Richard III – RSC at the Barbican; Garry Hines for The Playboy of the Western World – Donmar Warehouse; Barry Kyle for Golden Girls – RSC at The Pit and Love's Labour's Lost – RSC at the Barbican
Designer of the Year
**William Dudley for The Mysteries – National Theatre Cottesloe and The Critic – National Theatre Olivier**; Alison Chitty for Martine and She Stoops to Conquer – National Theatre Lyttelton; Bob Crowley for Henry V, Love's Labour's Lost and The Winter's Tale – RSC at the Barbican; Philip Prowse for The Duchess of Malfi – National Theatre Lyttelton and Phaedra – RSC at the Barbican
Outstanding Individual Performance of the Year in a New Dance Production	Outstanding New Dance Production of the Year
**Yoko Morishita in Giselle, Matsuyama Ballet Company – London Coliseum**; Bryony Brind in Young Apollo, The Royal Ballet – Royal Opera House; Stephen Jeffries in The Sons of Horus, The Royal Ballet – Royal Opera House; Roland Price in The Sleeping Beauty, Sadler's Wells Royal Ballet – Sadler's Wells	**Pictures, Merce Cunningham – Sadler's Wells**; Romeo and Juliet, London Festival Ballet – Royal Opera House; The Sons of Horus, The Royal Ballet – Royal Opera House; The Wand of Youth, Sadler's Wells Royal Ballet – Sadler's Wells
Outstanding Individual Performance of the Year in a New Opera Production	Outstanding New Opera Production of the Year
**Kathleen Battle in Ariadne auf Naxos, The Royal Opera – Royal Opera House**; Helen Field in Faust, English National Opera – London Coliseum; Kenneth Riegel in The Birthday of the Infanta, The Royal Opera – Royal Opera House; Marcus Stockhausen in Donnerstag aus Licht, The Royal Opera – Royal Opera House	**Xerxes, English National Opera – London Coliseum**; Akhnaten, English National Opera – London Coliseum; Donnerstag aus Licht, The Royal Opera – Royal Opera House; Faust, English National Opera – London Coliseum
Award for Outstanding Achievement
**Anthony Hopkins in Pravda – National Theatre Olivier**; Almeida Theatre; Season of Edward Bond – Royal Court Theatre; The Crucible and The Winter's Tale – RSC Tour
Society Special Award
**John Gielgud**

== Productions with multiple nominations and awards ==
The following 18 productions, including one ballet and two operas, received multiple nominations:

- 4: Les Misérables and Love's Labour's Lost
- 3: A Chorus of Disapproval, Pravda, Richard III and The Winter's Tale
- 2: Donnerstag aus Licht, Faust, Henry V, Lennon, Martine, Me and My Girl, The Crucible, The Mysteries, The Playboy of the Western World, The Road to Mecca, The Sons of Horus and Torch Song Trilogy

The following three productions received multiple awards:

- 3: A Chorus of Disapproval
- 2: Me and My Girl and The Mysteries

== See also ==
- 39th Tony Awards
