= Society of London Theatre =

English live theatre organisation, created 1908

- Abbreviation: SOLT
- Formation: 1908; 118 years ago
- Type: Trade association
- Affiliations: UK Theatre
- Website: solt.co.uk
- Formerly called: Society of West End Theatre Managers; Society of West End Theatre

The Society of London Theatre (SOLT) is a British trade association for West End theatre in London. It was founded in 1908 as Society of West End Theatre Managers, becoming the Society of West End Theatre in 1975, and then changing to its current name in 1994. SOLT is a not-for-profit organisation which speaks on behalf of the theatre owners, producers, and managers of all the major commercial and grant-aided theatres in London. SOLT shares an office with UK Theatre, its sister organisation.

As well as advocating for the interests of its members, SOLT promotes theatre through activities including the Laurence Olivier Awards, the TKTS ticket booth, Theatre Tokens, a fortnightly printed listings guide and OfficialLondonTheatre.com – a website providing news, ticket sales, and detailed listing of plays and musicals currently in production. The organisation also administers the audience development initiatives Kids Week and Official London Theatre's New Year Sale, and runs events including the 'behind-the-scenes' career fair, TheatreCraft, and West End LIVE, alongside Westminster City Council. SOLT also supports a number of theatrical charities including Stage One and Mousetrap Theatre Projects.

== See also ==
- English drama
- West End theatre
- Off West End
- Theatre of the United Kingdom
