= 1992 New Year Honours =

British royal recognitions

The New Year Honours 1992 were appointments by most of the Commonwealth realms of Queen Elizabeth II to various orders and honours to reward and highlight good works by citizens of those countries, and honorary ones to citizens of other countries. They were announced on 30 December 1991 to celebrate the year passed and mark the beginning of 1992.

== United Kingdom ==
=== Life Peer ===
==== Baroness ====
- Dame Shelagh Marjorie Roberts, DBE, Chairman of the London Tourist Board. Former MEP (C). Former Chairman, National Women's Advisory Committee of the Conservative Party.

==== Baron ====
- The Right Honourable Sir Reginald Ernest Prentice, former Member of Parliament, former Executive Member, Committee, National Union of Conservative Associations.
- Sir Brian Norman Roger Rix, CBE, DL, chairman, MENCAP (Royal Society for Mentally Handicapped Children and Adults).
- The Right Honourable William Thomas Rodgers, former Member of Parliament, Director-General, Royal Institute of British Architects.
- Sir David Clive Wilson, GCMG, Governor and Commander-in-Chief, Hong Kong.

=== Privy Counsellor ===
- Alastair Robertson Goodlad, MP, Treasurer of H.M. Household (Deputy Chief Whip). Member of Parliament for Eddisbury.
- (William Armand Thomas) Tristan Garel-Jones, MP, Minister of State, Foreign and Commonwealth Office. Member of Parliament for Watford.
- The Honourable Timothy Alan Davan Sainsbury, MP, Minister of State, Department of Trade and Industry. Member of Parliament for Hove.

=== Knight Bachelor ===
- Hugh Norman Annesley, QPM, Chief Constable, Royal Ulster Constabulary.
- John Michael Middlecott Banham, Director General, Confederation of British Industry.
- Thomas Baron, CBE, Chairman, Stockbridge Village Trust.
- Alan Rushton Battersby, Professor of Organic Chemistry, University of Cambridge.
- Alexander Ross Belch, CBE. For services to Scottish Industry.
- Dirk Bogarde, Dirk Niven van den Bògaerde, Actor.
- Michael Checkland, Director General, British Broadcasting Corporation.
- Anthony Brian Cleaver, Chairman and Chief Executive, IBM United Kingdom Holdings.
- Ivor Harold Cohen, CBE, TD, Chairman, Remploy.
- Michael Colin Cowdrey, CBE, Chairman, International Cricket Council.
- Thomas (Tom) Cowie, OBE. For political and public service.
- Geoffrey James Ellerton, CMG, MBE, Chairman, Local Government Boundary Commission for England.
- Matthew Alistair Grant, Chairman and Chief Executive, Argyll Group pic.
- Richard Greenbury, Chairman and Chief Executive Officer, Marks and Spencer plc.
- William Michael John Grylls, MP, For political service.
- John Gordon Hannam, MP, For political service.
- Gordon Robert Higginson, Vice-Chancellor, University of Southampton.
- Robert John (Robin) Maxwell-Hyslop, MP, For political service.
- John Trend Lacy. For political service.
- Ronald Thomas Stewart Macpherson, CBE, MC, TD, Chairman, National Employers' Liaison Committee.
- Robert Bruce Martin, QC, Chairman, North Western Regional Health Authority.
- James McKinnon, Director General of Gas Supply.
- Peter Quennell, CBE, For services to literature.
- Martin John Rees, Plumian Professor of Astronomy and Experimental Philosophy; Director, Institute of Astronomy, University of Cambridge.
- Michael Llewellyn Rutter, CBE, Professor of Child and Adolescent Psychiatry, Institute of Psychiatry, University of London.
- Andrew Colin Hugh Smith, Chairman, The London Stock Exchange.
- Professor James Runcieman Sutherland, Emeritus Professor of Modern English Literature, University College, London. For services to literature.
- Donald Thompson, MP, For political service.
- Magdi Habib Yacoub, British Heart Foundation Professor of Cardiac Surgery; Consultant Cardiac Surgeon, Harefield, Royal Brompton and National Heart Hospitals.

==== Diplomatic Service and Overseas List ====
- Gordon Menzies Macwhinnie CBE, For public and community services in Hong Kong.

=== The Most Honourable Order of the Bath ===
==== Knight Grand Cross of the Order of the Bath (GCB) ====
Military Division

Army

- General Sir Peter Inge, KCB, ADC, Gen, late The Green Howards (Alexandra Princess of Wales's Own Yorkshire Regiment), Colonel The Green Howards (Alexandra Princess of Wales's Own Yorkshire Regiment), Colonel Commandant Corps of Royal Military Police, Colonel Commandant Army Physical Training Corps.

Civil Division

- Sir Terence Michael Heiser, KCB, Permanent Secretary, Department of the Environment.

==== Knight Commander of the Order of the Bath (KCB) ====
Military Division

Royal Navy

- Vice Admiral Neville Purvis.

Army

- Lieutenant General Anthony Stephen Jeremy Blacker, CBE, late Royal Tank Regiment, Colonel Commandant Royal Tank Regiment, Colonel Commandant Corps of Royal Electrical and Mechanical Engineers.
- Lieutenant General Jeremy John George Mackenzie, OBE, late Queen's Own Highlanders (Seaforth and Camerons), Colonel Commandant Women's Royal Army Corps.
- Lieutenant General The Honourable William Edward Rous, OBE, late Coldstream Guards.

Royal Air Force

- Air Marshal John Robert Walker, CBE, AFC, Royal Air Force.

Civil Division

- James Nursaw, CB, QC, Her Majesty's Procurator General and Treasury Solicitor.
- Douglas Boucher Smith, CB, chairman, Advisory, Conciliation and Arbitration Service.
- Nigel Leonard Wicks, CVO, CBE, Second Permanent Secretary (Finance), Her Majesty's Treasury.

==== Companion of the Order of the Bath (CB) ====
Military Division

Royal Navy

- Rear Admiral John Patrick Windsor Middleton.
- Rear Admiral Ian Hugh Pirnie.

Army

- Major General John Taylor Coull, QHS, late Royal Army Medical Corps.
- Major General Peter Ronald Davies, late Royal Corps of Signals, Colonel Commandant Royal Corps of Signals, Colonel The King's Regiment.
- Major General Richard Morgan Llewellyn, OBE, late The Royal Welch Fusiliers, Colonel The Royal Welch Fusiliers, Colonel Gurkha Transport Regiment.
- Major General David Murray Naylor, MBE, late Scots Guards.
- Major General Patrick Phillip Dennant Stone, CBE, late The Royal Anglian Regiment, Colonel The Royal Anglian Regiment, Colonel Commandant Military Provost Staff Corps.

Royal Air Force

- Air Vice-Marshal John Michael Patrick Calnan, Royal Air Force.
- Air Vice-Marshal John Ernsting, OBE, QHS, Royal Air Force.
- Air Vice-Marshal Timothy Garden, Royal Air Force.

Civil Division

- Michael Ellis Abrams, Deputy Chief Medical Officer, Department of Health.
- Hugh Maben Barclay, lately Clerk of Public Bills, House of Commons.
- Leonard John Hobhouse Beighton, Director General, Board of Inland Revenue.
- Stephen Nigel Burbridge, Secretary, Monopolies and Mergers Commission.
- James Richard Coates, Grade 3, Department of Transport.
- John Maurice Crawley, Grade 3, Board of Inland Revenue.
- Michael John Culham, Grade 3, Ministry of Defence.
- Roger Lawrence Lowe Facer, Deputy Secretary, Ministry of Defence.
- Brian Terence Gilmore, Deputy Secretary, Cabinet Office.
- Anthony Hilgrove Hammond, Legal Adviser, Home Office.
- John Wilson Lloyd, Deputy Secretary, Welsh Office.
- William Ian Macintyre, Grade 3, Department of Energy.
- John Murray, Permanent Secretary, Department of the Environment, Northern Ireland.
- Edward Alexander Ryder, lately Her Majesty's Chief Inspector of Nuclear Installations, Health and Safety Executive.
- Peter Jefferson Smith, Deputy Chairman, Her Majesty's Customs and Excise.
- John Michael Medlicott Vereker, Deputy Secretary, Department of Education and Science.
- Christopher Roy Walker, Grade 3, Cabinet Office.

=== The Most Distinguished Order of Saint Michael and Saint George ===
==== Knight Grand Cross of the Order of St Michael and St George (GCMG) ====
- Sir John Whitehead, KCMG, CVO, H.M. Ambassador, Tokyo.

==== Knight Commander of the Order of St Michael and St George (KCMG) ====
- Brian Leon Barder, British High Commissioner, Canberra.
- Brian James Proetel Fall, CMG, British High Commissioner, Ottawa.
- William Nicoll, CMG, lately Director-General, Secretariat of the EC Commission, Brussels.
- Anthony Reeve, CMG, H.M. Ambassador, Pretoria.
- Philip John Weston, CMG, Foreign and Commonwealth Office.

==== Companion of the Order of St Michael and St George (CMG) ====
- John Saynor, Director-General, Commonwealth War Graves Commission.
- Charles Christian Wilfred Adams, Foreign and Commonwealth Office.
- Andrew Philip Foley Bache, Foreign and Commonwealth Office.
- Christopher Charles Richard Battiscombe, H.M. Ambassador, Algiers.
- Robert Andrew Burns, Foreign and Commonwealth Office.
- Kevin John Chamberlain, Foreign and Commonwealth Office.
- David Hicks Goodchild, CBE, For services to the British Community in Paris.
- Richard Hay, lately Director-General of Personnel, EC Commission, Brussels.
- Anthony James Longrigg, lately Counsellor, H.M. Embassy, Moscow.
- Miss Margaret Irene Rothwell, H.M. Ambassador, Abidjan.
- Anthony Aylett Rowell, Counsellor, H.M. Embassy, Pretoria.
- Bryan Sparrow, H.M. Consul-General, Lyons.
- David John Wright, LVO, H.M. Ambassador, Seoul.

=== Royal Victorian Order ===
==== Knight Grand Cross of the Royal Victorian Order (GCVO) ====
- Major Sir Ralph Hugo Anstruther, Bt., KCVO, MC

==== Dame Commander of the Royal Victorian Order (DCVO) ====
- Miss Mona Mitchell, CVO

==== Knight Commander of the Royal Victorian Order (KCVO) ====
- Air Chief Marshal Sir John Gingell, GBE, KCB
- Francis Nigel, Major the Lord Napier and Ettrick, CVO
- David Rodney Sweetnam, CBE, , FRCS

==== Commander of the Royal Victorian Order (CVO) ====
- John Leonard Dawson, , MS, FRCS
- Dr Hugh Ford, LVO, , FRCGP
- Group Captain Michael Vincent Philip Hunter Harrington, Royal Air Force (Retired).
- Robert (Robin) Charles Kernick.
- Michael Kershaw Ridley.
- Christopher John Robinson, LVO

==== Lieutenant of the Royal Victorian Order (LVO) ====
- Ian Anthony Balding.
- Commander Peter Charles Chapman-Andrews, Royal Navy.
- Paul David Grenville Hayter.
- Wallace John Keay.
- Sally, Mrs McCorquodale.
- John Christopher Parsons.
- Chief Superintendent Sydney Graham Simpson, Grampian Police.
- Leslie John Stevens, MBE

==== Member of the Royal Victorian Order (MVO) ====
- David Brown, TD
- Edith Anne Valerie, Mrs Cunningham.
- Major Barrie Trevor Eastwood, MBE
- Inspector Jeremy Gottlieb, Metropolitan Police.
- Chief Yeoman Warder Denis Percy Harding.
- Miss Sally Wyndham Hughes.
- Miss Kiloran Elizabeth McGrigor.
- Police Constable Andrew Merrylees, RVM, Metropolitan Police.
- Timothy Nettleton.
- Inspector Geoffrey William Padgham, Metropolitan Police.
- Lieutenant Commander Christopher William Pittaway, Royal Navy.
- John Wilfred Sanderson.
- Miss Dorothy Ann Shipsey.

==== Royal Victorian Medal (Gold) (RVM) ====
- John (Tam) Davidson, RVM

==== Bar to the Royal Victorian Medal (Silver) (RVM) ====
- Frank Samuel Cranston, RVM
- Arthur George Showell, RVM

==== Royal Victorian Medal (Silver) (RVM) ====
- Leading Steward Derek Douglas Craig, Royal Navy.
- Marine Engineering Mechanic (Mechanical) First Class Peter Anthony Found, Royal Navy.
- Harold Govier.
- Rodney William Douglas Haylor.
- Graham Charles Hulland.
- Frederick Roy Hutchings.
- Miss Elizabeth Ann Pickard.
- David John Skerritt.
- Sergeant Kenneth Anthony Thompson, ENG TECH AP (INT), Royal Air Force.
- Christopher Hinewood Arkell Williams.
- Chief Technician Derick Bernard Williams, ENG TECH A, Royal Air Force.

=== The Most Excellent Order of the British Empire ===
==== Knight Grand Cross of the Order of the British Empire (GBE) ====
- Air Chief Marshal Sir Anthony Skingsley, KCB, Royal Air Force.

==== Dame Commander of the Order of the British Empire (DBE) ====
- Miss Jocelyn Anita Barrow, OBE (Mrs Downer), deputy chairman, Broadcasting Standards Council.
- Avril Anne Barker, Mrs Poole, Chief Nursing Officer, Department of Health.
- Elisabeth Friederike Marie Olga, Mrs Legge-Schwarzkopf. For services to music.

==== Knight Commander of the Order of the British Empire (KBE) ====
Military Division

Royal Navy

- Vice Admiral David Stuart Dobson.

Army

- Lieutenant General Peter John Beale, QHP, late Royal Army Medical Corps.

Royal Air Force

- Air Marshal Robert James Michael Alcock, CB, Royal Air Force.

Civil Division

- Sir Charles Keith Frossard, Bailiff of Guernsey.

==== Commander of the Order of the British Empire (CBE) ====
Military Division

Royal Navy

- Captain Andrew Elliott Thomson
- Brigadier Rupert Cornelis van der Horst, OBE

Army

- Brigadier Anthony Kenneth Crawford, late Intelligence Corps.
- Brigadier Jill Margaret Field, RRC, Queen Alexandra's Royal Army Nursing Corps.
- Brigadier (now Major General) James Charles Mellish Gordon, late Royal Regiment of Artillery.
- Brigadier Noel Muddiman, OBE, late Royal Corps of Transport.
- Brigadier (now Major General) Peter John Sheppard, OBE, late Corps of Royal Engineers
- Brigadier Alexander Paul Simm, late The King's Regiment.
- Colonel John Douglas Stokoe, MBE, late Royal Corps of Signals.
- Colonel John Anthony Wright, MBE, late 16th/5th The Queen's Royal Lancers

Royal Air Force

- Air Commodore Nigel Bruce Baldwin
- Air Commodore Henry William Hall
- Group Captain Anthony John Harrison, OBE
- Air Commodore Anthony James Park
- Group Captain Clifford Rodney Spink, OBE

Civil Division

- Robert Wadsworth Adcock, DL, Chief Executive and Clerk, Essex County Council.
- Professor David Allen, Director, Strategic Financial Management Ltd.
- Ian David Stafford Beer, lately Head Master, Harrow School.
- Roger Humphrey Boissier, chairman, Pressac Holdings plc.
- Jack Wilkinson Bowman, QPM, Chief Constable, Tayside Police.
- William Charles Langdon Brown, OBE, lately Group Deputy Chairman and Deputy Group Chief Executive, Standard Chartered Bank plc.
- The Honourable James Michael Edward Bruce, chairman, Scottish Woodlands Ltd.
- Douglas Milne Cargill. For services to Agriculture in Scotland. President, Scottish Agricultural Organisation Society.
- Professor Henry Charnock, Member, Royal Commission on Environmental Pollution. For services to environmental protection.
- John Trevor Cliffe, lately Grade 5, Ministry of Defence.
- Brigadier James Alan Comrie Cowan, MBE, (Ret'd.) Secretary, Government Hospitality Fund.
- Ronald George Coxford, National Purchasing Executive, N.H.S. Supplies Authority.
- Michael Joseph Crumpton, Director of Research (Laboratories), Imperial Cancer Research Fund.
- Otto Charles Darby, chairman, Birmingham Training and Enterprise Council; Chief Executive, Bass Taverns Ltd., Director, Bass plc.
- Gareth Davies, chairman and Chief Executive, Glynwed International plc.
- Andrew Frank Davis, Chief Conductor, British Broadcasting Corporation Symphony Orchestra.
- James Allan Denholm, chairman, East Kilbride Development Corporation.
- Peter Doyle, Director, Group Research and Technology, Imperial Chemical Industries plc.
- Miss Rachael Mary Dyche. For political service.
- James Thompson Eaton, TD, chairman, Londonderry Port and Harbour Commissioners.
- Thomas Edge, chairman, Clothing and Allied Products Industry Training Board; chairman, CAPITB Trust.
- John Cooper Edwards, lately Grade 5, Ministry of Agriculture, Fisheries and Food.
- Richard Charles Hastings Eyre, Director, Royal National Theatre.
- Denis Edwin Filer, TD, Director General, Engineering Council.
- Thomas Finney, OBE, For services to Association Football.
- David Forrest, Secretary to the Board and executive director, Charity Commission.
- Malcolm John Frazer, Director and Chief Executive, Council for National Academic Awards.
- Sister Maire Teresa Gallagher, OBE, lately chairman, Scottish Consultative Council on the Curriculum.
- Peter Galliford, OBE, chairman, Galliford plc.
- Norman John Garrod, chairman, Printers Charitable Corporation; chairman, Publication Committee, The Royal Jubilee Trusts. For Charitable services.
- John Golding, Artist. Lately Trustee, Tate Gallery.
- Ronald Cairns Graham, General Manager, Tayside Health Board.
- Kenneth Walter Gray, Technical Director, Thorn EMI plc.
- Professor Cecil Grayson. For services to Italian studies
- Thomas Lloyd Grievson, chairman, Hunting BRAE Ltd; managing director, Defence Division, Hunting plc.
- Margaret McArthur, Mrs. Hall, Director, Legal Services Scottish Enterprise.
- Steven Fraser Hamilton, lately Town Clerk and Chief Executive, City of Glasgow District Council.
- Professor John Malcolm Harrington, chairman, Industrial Injuries Advisory Council
- Kenneth Harris. For services to Journalism.
- John Anthony Harvey, chairman and Chief Executive, Tibbett and Britten Group plc.
- John Smith Harvie. For political and public service.
- Miss Catherine Eileen Hawkins, Regional General Manager and Regional Nursing Officer, South Western Regional Health Authority.
- Henry Dickens Bourchier Hawksley, chairman, Wine Standards' Board of the Vintners' Company.
- Alan Hayes, chairman, European Trade Committee and Member, British Overseas Trade Board; chief executive officer, Agrochemicals and Seeds; Imperial Chemical Industries pic. For Services to Export.
- Giles Ian Henderson, Partner, Slaughter and May (Solicitors).
- Robin Granville Hodgson. For political service.
- Professor Jean Elizabeth Hooper, Principal, Solent School of Health Studies, Portsmouth.
- Alistair Allan Horne, Historian and Journalist.
- Brian Wardell James, Grade 5, Treasury Solicitor's Department.
- David Noel James, chairman, Davies and Newman; 'Company Doctor' for this and other companies.
- Malcolm Alexander Jeeves, Professor of Psychology, University of St. Andrews.
- William Bryan Jennett, Professor of Neurosurgery, Institute of Neurological Sciences, University of Glasgow.
- David William Felix Johnson, lately Grade 5, Department of Trade and Industry.
- Glynn Jones, Western Circuit Administrator, Lord Chancellor's Department.
- William Brian Jordan, President, Amalgamated Engineering Union
- Brian Keenan. For courage and fortitude while held hostage in the Lebanon.
- Robert Evan Kendell. For services to medical education.
- Professor David Nicol Sharp Kerr, formerly Dean, Royal Postgraduate Medical School. Professor of Renal Medicine, University of London.
- David Trevor Knowles, National Chairman, The Royal British Legion.
- Frank Ledger, OBE, deputy chairman, Nuclear Electric plc.
- James Taylor MacDougall, Procurator Fiscal, Dumfries.
- Jack (Jackie) Mann. For courage and fortitude while held hostage in the Lebanon.
- John Patrick McCarthy. For courage and fortitude while held hostage in the Lebanon.
- George Paul McNicol, Principal and Vice-Chancellor, University of Aberdeen.
- William McVey, lately assistant director, Scottish Prison Service.
- Patrick Alexander Metaxa, managing director, RHM Cereals
- David Sydney Mitchell, chairman, British Overseas Trade Board's Australia and New Zealand Trade Advisory Committee; Director, Commercial Services, Rolls-Royce Ltd. For services to Export.
- Trefor Alfred Morris, QPM, Her Majesty's Inspector of Constabulary, Eastern Region.
- Ian Harold Partridge, Concert singer. For services to Music.
- Anthony Reginald Pender, Chief Executive, English Industrial Estates Corporation.
- John Chidlaw Percival, lately chairman, Edward Rushton Son and Kenyon.
- John Wilson Phillips, former chairman, Confederation of British Industry Wales.
- John Richard Noel (Jack) Phipps, Director of Touring, Arts Council of Great Britain.
- Brian Ramsdale, lately Deputy Chief Scientific Officer, Ministry of Defence.
- David Edward Rayner, Member, British Railways Board.
- James Douglas Moir Robertson, DL, Leader of the Majority Group, Surrey County Council.
- Sara (Sally), Mrs. Salisbury, MBE, For political service.
- Humphrey Salwey, TD, For services to agriculture.
- Geoffrey Tait Sammons, Member, Building Societies Commission.
- Professor Samuel Berrick Saul, chairman, Central Council for Education and Training in Social Work.
- David Simpson, chairman and managing director, Simpson Research Ltd.
- John Robert Simpson, Grade 5, Department of Social Security.
- Raymond Edward Smallman, Feeney Professor of Metallurgy and Materials Science, and Vice Principal, University of Birmingham.
- Kenneth Anderson Smart, Grade 5, Department of Education, Northern Ireland.
- John Steedman, lately President, Scottish Football League.
- Miss Vivien Stern, Director, National Association for the Care and Resettlement of Offenders.
- Miss Rosemary Sutcliff, OBE, Writer.
- Rodney Newman Swarbrick, DL, lately President, Country Landowners' Association.
- Derek Taylor, managing director, NNC Ltd.
- John Derek Taylor. For political service.
- Colin Hugh Thomas, OBE, lately Her Majesty's Chief Inspector of Probation.
- James Thomas, chairman, East Dyfed District Health Authority and for services to Agriculture.
- Professor Francis Michael Longstreth Thompson, President, Royal Historical Society.
- Thomas Kenneth (Ken) Thornber. For political service.
- Victor Ronald Tindall, Professor of Obstetrics and Gynaecology, University of Manchester.
- Professor Paul Turner, chairman, Committee on Toxicity of Chemicals in Food, Consumer Products and the Environment; Professor of Clinical Pharmacology, University of London.
- Peter Tween, Director, Hogg Robinson plc.
- Terence Hardy Waite. For courage and fortitude while held hostage in the Lebanon.
- Michael John Wanstall, Grade 4, Department of the Environment.
- Ian Glendinning Watt, Partner, KPMG Peat, Marwick.
- Klaus Wedell, Professor of Educational Psychology, Children with Special Educational Needs, Institute of Education, University of London.
- John Granville White, Group Managing Director, BBA Group plc.
- Cedric Ellis Williams, Grade 5, Ministry of Defence.
- Peter Michael Williams, Group Chairman and Chief Executive, Oxford Instruments plc.
- Alan James Willis, Director of Property Services, Essex County Council.
- Graham Woodcock, OBE, For political and public service.
- Henry Edward Wright, QFSM, lately Chief Officer, South Yorkshire Fire Service.

Diplomatic Service and Overseas List

- Eric Charles Barnes, Judge of the High Court, Hong Kong.
- Charles Mckenzie Chadwick, OBE, Director, British Council, Poland.
- Anson Maria Elizabeth Mrs. Chan Fang JP, Secretary for Economic Services, Hong Kong.
- Peter Max Felix. For services to British commercial interests in New York.
- Charles Germain Gaggero, OBE, For public services in Gibraltar.
- Michael Leung Man-kin, JP, Secretary for Transport, Hong Kong.
- Nathaniel William Hamish Macleod, JP, Financial Secretary, Hong Kong.
- Ralph Owen Marshall. For public services in Bermuda.
- Robert Frederick Stimson, lately Governor of St. Helena.

==== Officer of the Order of the British Empire (OBE) ====
Military Division

Royal Navy

- Surgeon Commander Christopher John Davis
- Commander Patrick Richard Gage
- Acting Captain Peter James King
- Acting Captain Michael John Larmuth
- Commander Michael Charles Nixon
- Commander Anthony Mervyn Poulter
- Commander Bernard Eric Steed
- Commander Keith Thomas
- Commander David Greenaway Widgery
- Commander David Patrick Wilson

Army

- Lieutenant Colonel Valerie Batchelor, Women's Royal Army Corps.
- Acting Lieutenant Colonel John Ross Beckett, Combined Cadet Force, Territorial Army.
- Lieutenant Colonel Ronald William Berridge, BEM, Royal Army Ordnance Corps
- Lieutenant Colonel Robin Michael Chisnall, The Royal Anglian Regiment.
- Lieutenant Colonel Richard Paul Cousens, The Light Infantry
- Lieutenant Colonel Colin Alexander Den-McKay, Royal Army Ordnance Corps
- Lieutenant Colonel Timothy Roger Dumas, Royal Regiment of Artillery.
- Lieutenant Colonel Alan Victor Glasby, GM, Royal Army Ordnance Corps.
- Lieutenant Colonel (now Colonel) Patrick John Henderson, MBE, Royal Corps of Transport.
- Lieutenant Colonel Robert James Lampard, Corps of Royal Engineers.
- Lieutenant Colonel Nigel Brian Noble, Royal Army Pay Corps.
- Lieutenant Colonel John Francis Penley, TD, The Royal Wessex Yeomanry, Territorial Army.
- Lieutenant Colonel Peter William Cornwall Read, Royal Regiment of Artillery.
- Lieutenant Colonel Geoffrey Martin Simmonds, Royal Army Educational Corps.
- Lieutenant Colonel John Maitland William Stenhouse, MVO, The Gordon Highlanders.
- Lieutenant Colonel Neville James Cameron Washington, Queen's Own Highlanders (Seaforth and Camerons).
- Lieutenant Colonel John David Vyvyan Woolley, 17th/21st Lancers.

Royal Air Force

- Wing Commander Thomas McKenzie Arnot, MBE
- Wing Commander Gordon Benson Browne
- Wing Commander Michael Ralph Hamilton Connor
- Wing Commander Ronald James Charles Dawson
- Wing Commander Stanley Albert Hickey
- Wing Commander Norman David Hughes
- Wing Commander Keith William Ifould, AFC
- Wing Commander John Wallace Marshall
- Wing Commander Andrew John Parsons
- Wing Commander David Richard Williams
- Wing Commander Gordon Arthur Woolley, AFC

Civil Division

- Paul Frederick Addis. For political service.
- Roy Ewart Adkins, lately Partner, Grant Thornton Chartered Accountants.
- Gerald Gordon Amery, Group General Manager, Technical Group, Co-Operative Wholesale Society Ltd.
- Albert Simeon Alan Archer, Administrator, St. Mary the Virgin Charity, Newcastle.
- Eric Davies Armitage, Chief Executive, North British Housing Association. Lately Chairman, National Council, National Federation of Housing Associations.
- The Right Honourable Raymond Benedict Bartholomew Michael Viscount Asquith, First Secretary, Foreign and Commonwealth Office.
- Russell Austin, lately Grade 7, Ministry of Defence.
- Alan Baker, Grade 7, Ministry of Defence.
- William Barber DFM, Consultant Hydrologist.
- Wendy, Mrs. Baron, Director, Government Art Collection.
- John Barr, managing director, FBM Marine.
- Anthony Joseph Jackman Bartlett. For charitable services in the City of Westminster.
- John Arthur Bergg, Director of Highways and Transportation, Surrey County Council.
- James Ingram Bill, Group Managing Director, John Graham (Dromore) Ltd.
- John Binnie, Deputy Managing Director, Allied Colloids Group plc. For services to Export.
- William James Bishop. For services to rugby football union in Cornwall.
- Ivor Frederick Blomfield, Deputy Director-General and Director, The Regions, The National Trust.
- Keith Joseph Brent, Deputy Head, Long Ashton Research Station, Agricultural and Food Research Council.
- Donald Jack Briggs, Grade 6, Foreign and Commonwealth Office.
- Professor Thomas Bromly, Dean, Arts and Design, Newcastle Polytechnic.
- Thomas Johnstone Burness, Principal, Glenrothes College.
- John Ronald Burnet, lately chairman, Yorkshire and Humberside Council for Sport and Recreation.
- John Granville Capey, Principal, Exeter College.
- William David Charles Carling, Captain, England Rugby Team.
- Robert Lewis Carter, lately Professor of Insurance Studies, The University of Nottingham.
- Daniel Columba Carty, chairman, Northern Ireland Post Office Board.
- Reginald William Cave. For services to architecture and conservation in Oxford.
- Peter William Chandler, Grade 7, Ministry of Defence.
- John Cumming Chapman. For services to the meat industry in Scotland.
- Donald Thomas Clarkson, Director and Executive Manager, Rolls-Royce and Associates Ltd.
- Henry Forester Cleere, lately Director, Council for British Archaeology.
- Robert Thomas Clement, Adviser for Art and Design, Devon Local Education Authority
- John Maynard Clements, Remploy Divisional Manager (Bookbinding).
- David John Close, Group Human Resources Director, Simon Engineering plc.
- Bernard Clouter, deputy chairman, British Airways Engine Overhaul Ltd.
- George Cole, Actor.
- John Joseph Conway, Chief Adjudication Officer, Department of Health and Social Services, Northern Ireland.
- Roy Frederick Cooke, Grade 6, Home Office.
- Timothy Richard Cowell. For political service.
- Colin James Currie, Grade 6, Department of the Environment.
- Fiona Jane, Mrs. Dalrymple. For services to the pig industry in Scotland.
- David Clive Jones-Davies, Principal, Trinity College, Carmarthen.
- Norman George Davies, Leader, Wolverhampton Borough Council.
- Anthony Francis Deakin, Director, Central Group, British Coal Corporation.
- David John Dean, Principal, Raddery School, Fortrose, Ross-shire
- Jeannie Anne Godfrey, Mrs. Dennison, Grade 7, Department of Health.
- Monica Hillary, Mrs. Drinkwater. For political service.
- Francis Barrie Dugdale, lately Community Relations Manager, Shell UK Ltd.
- Dorothy, Mrs. Dunnett, Author.
- Robert John Dutton, Chief Executive, Wrexham Maelor District Council.
- Brian Oliver Dyer, Grade 7, Her Majesty's Treasury.
- Norman James Eden, managing director, Government Business Operations, Multilift Ltd., Shrewsbury.
- Eric Edwards, Director, Shellfish Association of Great Britain. For services to the shellfish industry.
- John Albert Edwards, Chief Executive, Barnsley Metropolitan Borough Council.
- John Ashton Edwards, chairman, Wales Council for the Disabled.
- David Christopher Ross Elliott, Grade 7, Ministry of Defence.
- Michael Geoffrey Ellis Paulson-Ellis, Registrar and Secretary, University of East Anglia.
- Kenneth George Faircloth, Deputy Director General, Automobile Association.
- James Keith Farquharson, lately Director, Special Projects, Highlands and Islands Enterprise.
- Thomas Henry Farrell, chairman, Dental Practice Board.
- Nicholas Coit Flemming, Grade 6, Marine Sciences Directorate, Institute of Oceanographic Sciences, Deacon Laboratory.
- David Ross Flockhart, lately Director, Scottish Council for Voluntary Organisations.
- Warren Fowler. For political and public service.
- Trevor Jonathan Gadd, Governor 1, Her Majesty's Prison, Wakefield.
- David Frederick Roberts George, Farmer. Chairman, Dyfed Seeds.
- Raymond Gerrard. For services to the community in Manchester.
- Andrew Patrick Somerset Gibbs, lately First Secretary, Foreign and Commonwealth Office.
- Ian Goodwin Gibson. For services to local Government.
- The Reverend Charles Robert Wolsey Gilbert. For services to the Methodist Church.
- Timothy Joseph Gilligan, ERD, DL, Founder Chairman of the Hertfordshire Groundwork Foundation and currently chairman, Groundwork Associates Ltd.
- Maurice Templeton Gilmour, Adviser for Drama and Dance, Leicestershire County Council.
- Antonio Benito Giovanazzi, Her Majesty's Inspector of Schools, Scottish Office.
- Terence Edward Golding, Chief Executive, National Exhibition Centre Ltd.
- Lewis Raphael Goodman, Enterprise Adviser to the Department of Trade and Industry. For services to industry and commerce in the United Kingdom.
- George Ernest Goring, managing director, Goring Hotel. For services to the hotel industry.
- Celia Frances, Mrs. Gourley, Grade 7, Industrial Development Board, Northern Ireland.
- Denis Alfred Headley-Green. For political service.
- Nigel Haigh, Director, Institute for European Environmental Policy, London.
- Michael Peter Leopold Hamburger, Poet/Translator.
- Stanley Hardacre, lately Grade 6, Department of Social Security.
- Lavender Susan Mary, Mrs. Hardy. For services to the community in Cheltenham, Gloucestershire.
- Brian Howard Hawker, Grade 6, Welsh Office.
- James Mitchell Hawkins, lately Technical Director, Dunlop-Beaufort Ltd., Birkenhead.
- Donald Leslie Heath, Director, Railways (Cross Rail), British Railways Board.
- Robert Richard Dyson Heaton, chairman, Heaton's Transport (St. Helens) Ltd.; National Chairman, Road Haulage Association.
- Margaret Elizabeth, Mrs. Hemmings, Headteacher, Lewis Girls' Comprehensive School, Ystrad Mynach, Mid Glamorgan
- The Honourable (Mary) Sheila, Mrs. Hensman, Vice President and chairman, Cumbria Tourist Board.
- Naru Hira, Senior Consultant Surgeon, The Royal Oldham Hospital.
- Ernest Herbert Hodge. For public service in Richmond, North Yorkshire.
- Miss Catherine Ann Hollway, Chief Probation Officer, Cambridgeshire.
- John Nevill Hornibrook, VRD, Director, Roche Products Ltd., Dairy, Ayrshire.
- Jenny, Mrs. Hughes, Member, Armed Forces Pay Review Body.
- John Peter Jillings, lately Director of Social Services, Derbyshire.
- Anne Margaret, Mrs. Jobson. For political and public service.
- Karen Jane Gabrielle, Mrs. Johnston. For political and public service.
- Alec George Karseras. For services to Medicine and Care in the Community in South Wales.
- Evelyn, Mrs. Keane, Director of Quality Assurance and Chief Nurse, Mid-Cheshire Hospitals, National Health Service Trust
- John Kelly, chairman, Council of the Royal College of Nursing.
- Randal Hume Keynes, Grade 6, Ministry of Defence.
- Colin James Kirkland, Technical Director, Eurotunnel.
- Hans Gustav Kurer, General Dental Practitioner, Central Manchester.
- George Laws, lately Director of Finance, Trafford Metropolitan Borough Council.
- Francis William Leath. For services to the community in Shrewsbury, Shropshire.
- Eirion Thomas Lewis, National Officer for Wales and the West of England, Independent Broadcasting Authority/Independent Television Commission.
- Gary Winston Lineker. For services to Association Football.
- Professor Robin Sydney Mackwood Ling, emeritus Consultant Orthopaedic Surgeon, Royal Devon and Exeter and Princess Elizabeth Orthopaedic Hospitals, Exeter.
- John Bernard Lynch. For services to Medicine in Wales.
- Ian George Stewart MacGregor. For services to The Scout Association in Scotland.
- Miss Susan Katriona MacGregor, Radio Broadcaster, Presenter, British Broadcasting Corporation Radio Four.
- Marie Alpine, Mrs. Macmillan, chairman, Western Isles Health Board.
- Lieutenant Colonel Oscar Thomas William Major, chairman, West Sussex Branch, Soldiers', Sailors' and Airmen's Families Association.
- Margaret Fleetwood, Countess of Malmesbury DL, For services to the community in Basingstoke, Hampshire.
- Peter John Mann, Chief Ambulance Officer, Wiltshire; Regional Ambulance Adviser, Wessex.
- Brian William Mansell, County Surveyor, Cornwall County Council.
- Ann Faulkner, Mrs. Markham, Dean, Faculty of Education, Sport and Leisure, Brighton Polytechnic.
- Alexander Edward Marnoch, QPM, lately Commander, Metropolitan Police.
- Professor Leonard George Marsh, Principal, Bishop Grosseteste College, Lincoln.
- Ronald Kerr Martin, chairman, Scotch Whisky Production, United Distillers plc.
- Trevor Lawson McDonald, Broadcaster, Independent Television News.
- Herbert Edward McGee. For services to the community in Sheffield.
- Patrick Thomas (Tom) McInerney, managing director, UK Nirex Ltd.
- Findlay Blair McQuarrie, Director West, The National Trust for Scotland.
- David John McWeeny, Grade 5, Ministry of Agriculture, Fisheries and Food.
- Valerie Eileen, Mrs. Measures, Group Marketing Director, Guy Birkin Ltd. For services to Export.
- Joyce Mildred, Mrs. Morris. For services to Literacy.
- Sheila Edmondson Lloyd, Lady Mostyn, DL, lately President and Chairman of the Clwyd Branch, British Red Cross Society.
- John Forbes Munro, Consultant Physician and Senior Lecturer, Eastern General and Edenhall Hospitals, Edinburgh.
- Kenneth Banks Ohlson, MC, TD, lately chairman, South East Council for Sport and Recreation.
- Major Peter Michael Olver, Assistant Chief Inspecting Officer of Railways, Health and Safety Executive.
- John Orr, Deputy Chief Constable, Dumfries and Galloway Constabulary.
- Arthur Joseph Parkes, Corporate Sales Director, Nestle Company Ltd.
- James Peter Hill Paton, lately Chief Executive, Falkirk District Council.
- Mary Patricia, Mrs. Patten, Senior Lecturer, Institute of Continuing Education, Queen's University Belfast.
- George Harry Pattinson, Founder, The Windermere Nautical Trust and The Cooper Pattinson's Trust Homes.
- Mary Kathleen, Mrs. Pedersen, lately Principal, St. Cecilia's Secondary School, Londonderry.
- Michael Murray Webb-Peploe, Honorary Civilian Cardiologist to the Army.
- Charles Roger Perks, Headteacher, Baverstock Grant Maintained School, Birmingham.
- David John Perry, Grade 6, Forestry Commission.
- Diana Elizabeth, Mrs. Pidgeon. For political and public service.
- David Pointon, Director, Anglo Taiwan Trade Committee, Taipei. For services to Export.
- David Leonard Poole, Chief Nursing Officer, North Bedfordshire Health Authority.
- Miss Hazel Pamela Prosper, Secretary General and Director, Girls Venture Corp Air Cadets.
- David George Punt, Grade 6, Department of Trade and Industry.
- Professor John Howard Purnell, Professor of Chemistry, University College, Swansea.
- John Robson Reid, DL, For services to the Mayoralty and the Corporation of London.
- Peter Reid, QFSM, Chief Officer, Staffordshire Fire and Rescue Service.
- Adrian Alan Restorick, Grade 6, Lord Chancellor's Department.
- Professor John David Rhodes, Chief Executive, chairman and Technical Director, Filtronic Components Ltd.
- Christine Margaret, Mrs. Richard. For political and public service.
- Major Colin David Robins, (Ret'd.) Inspector of Taxes (SP), Board of Inland Revenue.
- Maurice Thomas Rogers, lately Secretary and Editor, Commonwealth Forestry Association.
- Frances Mary, Mrs. Roualle. For political and public service.
- James Francis McMillan Rowan, Member, Lay Panel, Juvenile Courts in Northern Ireland.
- Allan George Sellar, Provost, Inverness District Council.
- Sister Barbara Helena Ita Sexton, Headteacher, Mount St Joseph School, Bolton.
- Ann, Mrs. Shaw. For political and public service.
- Donald Welton Shepherd, Executive Chairman, Portakabin Group of Companies.
- Raymond Showell, lately Secretary and General Manager, Operational Research Society.
- John William Shute, chairman and managing director, International Automotive Design (UK) Ltd.
- Peter Bamford Simpkin, Member, Committee for Middle East Trade; Consultant on Business Developments, George Wimpey. For services to Export.
- George Ballantyne Pryde Smith, lately Headteacher, Boclair Academy, Bearsden.
- Ian McKenzie Smith, City Arts Officer, Aberdeen.
- Major Peter Barry Snowden. For services to Yachting.
- Hugh George Howard Stafford, lately chairman, Distributive Industry Training Trust.
- Richard Steele, Farmer. For services to agriculture in the Midlands.
- John Corbet Stewart, Regional Scientific Officer, West Midlands Regional Health Authority.
- Professor Frederick Hope Stone. For services to the care of young people.
- Miss Marion Hooper Tait (Mrs. Morse), Prima Ballerina, Birmingham Royal Ballet.
- John Nelson Tarn, Roscoe Professor of Architecture, University of Liverpool, and Acting Vice-Chancellor.
- Anita Mary, Mrs. Tasker, lately chairman, Central Council of Magistrates' Courts Committees.
- Donald John Taylor, lately Chief Operation Engineer, Eastern Electricity.
- John Taylor, lately District Chairman, Crewe Health Authority.
- Michael Harry Rex Thompson, lately Deputy Chief Executive, Lloyds Bank plc.
- Dennis William Townhill. For services to Organ and Church Music in Scotland.
- Ronald Edmund Trigg. For political service.
- William Clive Trigg, Grade 6, assistant director, Property Services Agency, Department of the Environment.
- John Edward Troth, managing director, Dennis Ruabon Ltd.
- Winifred Letitia, Mrs. Tumim, lately chairman, Independent Living Fund.
- Peter Rodney David Turner, Headmaster, The Whitefield School and Centre.
- Cecil Norman Unwin, managing director, C N Unwin Ltd.
- Shriramashetty Venugopal. For services to the community in Birmingham.
- John Desmond Waldron, chairman, Kratos Group plc and Kratos Analytical Ltd.
- George Robert Walker, lately Headmaster, Cavendish School, Hemel Hempstead.
- Norman Whitmore Walker, deputy director, Newspaper Society.
- Elizabeth Despard, Mrs. Ward, MBE, President, British Kidney Patients' Association.
- Iris Margaret Eleanor, Mrs. Weaver, DL, For services to the community in Northern Ireland.
- Nigel David Warwick Weaver, General Manager, Barnet Health Authority.
- David John Tudor Webb, Grade 7, Department of the Environment.
- Wing Commander Oliver Wells, DL, For services to the community in Bedfordshire.
- Dorothy Marion, Mrs. White. For services to the community in London, N.W. 11.
- Roy Owen White. For political service.
- Ian Robert Fleming-Williams, Art Historian.
- Professor Alan Wilson, Research and Development Manager, Total Oil Marine.
- Peter John Witt, Director, British Road Federation.
- Frances Ann, Mrs. Foote Wood. For political service.
- George Allen Wright, managing director, AEP Holdings Ltd.
- Wing Commander Michael David Wright, MBE, R.A.F. (Ret'd.), lately Security Executive, British Airports Authority plc.

Diplomatic Service and Overseas List

- Ralph James Reginald Barrett. For services to agricultural development in Belize.
- David John Bowers, lately Acting Chief Architect, Ministry of Works, Malawi.
- Andrew Jonathan Corrie Boyd, lately First Secretary, H.M. Embassy, Mexico City.
- Robert Anthony Broughton. For services to British commercial interests in Brazil.
- Francis William Browne. For services to British commercial interests in Australia.
- Peter James Bryers. For services to British commercial interests in Japan.
- Dr. Nigel Groyer Buckley. For services to British commercial interests in Bulgaria.
- Alan John Burnett. For services to British aviation interests in India.
- John Leonard Bush. For services to the British community in Mexico.
- Norman Stanley Campbell. For services to the British community in Indonesia.
- Christopher Cheng Wai-chee, JP, For public services in Hong Kong.
- Chow Yei-ching. For services to British commercial interests in Hong Kong.
- Lieutenant-Colonel (Retd.) John Joseph Geoffrey Cox MBE. For services to ex-servicemen in France.
- Alan Denness. For services to agricultural development in Tanzania.
- The Reverend George Charles Golding. For educational and welfare services to the community in Bangladesh.
- Richard William Ground, QC, Attorney General, Cayman Islands.
- Dr. Archibald Cameron Hollis Hallett. For services to education in Bermuda.
- Atlin Harrigan, Speaker, House of Assembly, Anguilla.
- Walter Ralph Head. For services to British commercial interests in Australia.
- Edward Ho Sing-tin, JP. For public services in Hong Kong.
- Tomas Neville Hudson. For services to British commercial and community interests in Argentina.
- Dr. Pranlal Chunilal Kothari, Medical Officer, Health Department, Montserrat.
- Geoffrey William Martin, lately Chief Justice, Kingdom of Tonga.
- Thomas Wilson Morgan, lately Sector Head, Security Office, B.C. Commission, Brussels.
- Michael Bruce Leathley Nightingale, Director, British Council, Addis Ababa.
- The Reverend Canon Thomas Norman Nisbett. For services to the community in Bermuda.
- Professor Alastair Macarthur North. For services to technological development in Thailand.
- Peter David Orwin, MC, First Secretary, H.M. Embassy, Tel Aviv.
- Professor Poon Chung-kwong, JP. For public services in Hong Kong.
- William Lewis Radford, lately Director, British Council, South Africa.
- William Innes Rae, MBE, First Secretary and Consul, H.M. Embassy, Bahrain.
- Dr. Stuart Bennett Reed, JP, Director of Environmental Protection, Hong Kong.
- Austin Alexander Robinson, MBE, Financial Secretary, Turks and Caicos Islands.
- Alan George Scurr. For services to British commercial interests in the United Arab Emirates.
- Professor Roger David Sell. For services to English teaching in Finland.
- Richard Brenton Sinker. For services to the British community in the Netherlands.
- Richard Denis Stevens. For services to British commercial and community interests in São Paulo.
- Arthur John West, lately Head of Public Safety Section, British Mission, Berlin.
- Jack Cressey White. For services to English teaching in Madrid.

==== Member of the Order of the British Empire (MBE) ====
Military Division

Royal Navy

- Captain Maurice John Andrews
- Acting Commander John David Coker
- Chaplain Gordon William Craig
- Lieutenant Commander Graham Lloyd Fielding
- Lieutenant Thomas Christopher Hope
- Lieutenant Commander Michael John Hudson
- Warrant Officer David Simon Charles Lodrick
- Lieutenant Commander Philip Bentley Mathias
- Lieutenant Commander Fred Patchett
- Warrant Officer Ian Michael Perry
- Warrant Officer Michael Robertson
- Lieutenant Commander (SCC) Derrick Francis Ward
- Warrant Officer 1 Joseph Desmond Wassall
- Warrant Officer Peter John Willis
- Lieutenant William Emerson Wilson

Army

- Captain John Aspinall, Royal Corps of Signals.
- Major Hugh Babington Smith, The Royal Green Jackets.
- Major Michael Gordon Beazley, Corps of Royal Engineers.
- Major Michael John Bennett, Royal Regiment of Artillery.
- Major Michael Stephen Burke, The Gloucestershire Regiment.
- Warrant Officer Class 1 Nigel Davies, Royal Army Ordnance Corps.
- Warrant Officer Class 2 James Arnold Davis, The Parachute Regiment.
- Major Victor David Ebbens, The Queen's Regiment.
- Major Harold Crispin Hardy Ellison, Royal Tank Regiment.
- Major David Joseph Elsam, The Worcestershire and Sherwood Foresters Regiment (29th/45th Foot).
- Major John Brian Frost, Corps of Royal Engineers.
- Major Jane Elizabeth Grafton, Women's Royal Army Corps.
- Major (now Lieutenant Colonel) Michael Anthony Haynes, The Parachute Regiment.
- Captain Joseph Hill, QGM, The Parachute Regiment.
- Major Marian Florence Lauder, Women's Royal Army Corps.
- Warrant Officer Class 1 (Conductor) Dennis John Leadbeater, Royal Army Ordnance Corps.
- Major Jacqueline Ann Lindsay, Women's Royal Army Corps.
- Warrant Officer Class 1 David Liptrot, Royal Pioneer Corps.
- Captain Michael Campbell Low, The Royal Scots (The Royal Regiment)
- Major Brian Dean Mellor, The Queen's Own Hussars.
- Captain Michael Moran, Royal Army Ordnance Corps.
- Warrant Officer Class 2 John Newberry, Royal Regiment of Artillery, Territorial Army.
- Warrant Officer Class 1 Peter John Noad, The Queen's Lancashire Regiment.
- Warrant Officer Class 2 Richard Paul Osborne, Royal Army Ordnance Corps.
- Lieutenant Neville Richard Park, Royal Army Medical Corps.
- Major Allan Miles Phillips, The Royal Welch Fusiliers.
- Major Michael Alexander Harrison Pick, The Green Howards (Alexandra Princess of Wales's Own Yorkshire Regiment).
- Major Anthony James Podmore, TD, Yorkshire Volunteers, Territorial Army.
- Major Alan John Porter, Royal Regiment of Artillery.
- Captain Peter John Douglas Ralph, Royal Pioneer Corps.
- Major Kenneth John Rawlings, TD, Royal Corps of Transport, Territorial Army.
- Captain David John Sanderson, The Queen's Lancashire Regiment.
- Captain Phillip Ronald Scourlock, Corps of Royal Engineers.
- Captain William Thomas Simmonett, The Royal Regiment of Fusiliers, Territorial Army.
- Major Leonard Edward Smith, The Worcestershire and Sherwood Foresters Regiment (29th/45th Foot), Territorial Army.
- Warrant Officer Class 2 David Douglas Hally Stagey, The Black Watch (Royal Highland Regiment).
- Major Peter Marcus Telford, Royal Corps of Signals.
- Major Michael Munro Tulloch, The Worcestershire and Sherwood Foresters Regiment (29th/45th Foot).
- Major Michael Underhill, 9th/12th Royal Lancers (Prince of Wales's)
- Warrant Officer Class 1 (now Lieutenant) Raymond Walker, Scots Guards.
- Acting Major Granville Forbes Wastie, Combined Cadet Force, Territorial Army.
- Major Ian Waters, Corps of Royal Military Police.
- Warrant Officer Class 1 Lawrence William Wells, 13th/18th Royal Hussars (Queen Mary's Own).
- Major Nigel Thomas Stanley Williams, Corps of Royal Electrical and Mechanical Engineers.
- Major Nicholas Frederick Winder, Corps of Royal Engineers.

Overseas Division

- Major Eric Lee Heung-Cheuk, Royal Hong Kong Regiment (The Volunteers).

Royal Air Force

- Warrant Officer George Raymond Astley
- Squadron Leader Noel Robert Cook
- Flight Lieutenant Carol Mary Couchman
- Squadron Leader Sheelagh Veronica Duly
- Squadron Leader James Frank Foley
- Squadron Leader Colin Ernest Gingell
- Flight Lieutenant Phillip James Haward
- Warrant Officer James Joseph Hutton
- Squadron Leader Martin John Kilshaw
- Squadron Leader Donald Marshall
- Squadron Leader Cyril Robert Miles
- Warrant Officer John Ernest Morley
- Squadron Leader Gordon Moulds
- Squadron Leader Angela Mary Newcombe
- Warrant Officer Michael James Owen
- Warrant Officer Keith Donald Roper
- Flight Lieutenant Gabriel Sexton
- Warrant Officer Robin Graham Shaw, BEM
- Squadron Leader Susan Elizabeth Smith
- Squadron Leader Christopher John Taylor
- Squadron Leader Brian Lawrence Trood
- Squadron Leader Nigel Robin Tuffs
- Squadron Leader Mark Norman Vincenti
- Warrant Officer David Welsh
- Flight Lieutenant Stephen Williams

Civil Division

- Miss Margaret Evelyn Adams, Department Head, Midwifery and Women's Health, Queen Charlotte's College of Health Care, Polytechnic of West London, Baling.
- Victor Joseph Aiken, General Manager, Ulster Farmers' Investments Ltd.
- Ronald Thomson Aitken. For services to The Save The Children Fund, Edinburgh.
- Miss Victoria Leathley Andrew, executive director, Cedemp Ltd. For services to the Disabled of Cleveland.
- Walter Johann Anzer, Secretary General, British Association of Canned Food Importers' and Distributors' and National Dried Fruit Association.
- Miss Pamela Ann Appleby, Member, Chiltern District Council.
- Eric Ashby. For services to Wildlife.
- William Terence Atkinson, Head, Music Department, Queen Elizabeth High School, Hexham
- Miss Lesley Erna Christine Attwood, executive director, The Golf Foundation.
- Ralph Bacon, Head, Derby Schools' Music Centre.
- Ellen Theresa, Mrs. Bailey. For services to the Royal Navy.
- Miss June Moyra Bailey, lately Director of Nursing, the Royal Star and Garter Home for Disabled Sailors, Soldiers and Airmen.
- Peter Richard Baker, General Medical Practitioner, Macclesfield, Cheshire, lately Member, General Practice Finance Corporation.
- Walter Vego Baker, Chief Executive, South London Business Initiative.
- William Thomas Ball, Senior Professional Technology Officer, English Heritage Survey Services.
- Anne, Mrs. Baxandall, chairman, Friends of Fareham Museum.
- Donald William Bean. For services to the community in Stafford.
- Ian James Beaton, Assistant Principal and Head of Electrical and Electronic Engineering Department, Bell College of Technology.
- David Beatty, DFC, For services to Aviation.
- Jack Beverley Beaumont. For political service.
- Violet Ethel, Mrs. Beckett. For political service.
- Francis John Bedell, Farmer. For services to agriculture and to the community in Shropshire.
- Colonel William Bell, Diocesan Secretary, Diocese of Worcester.
- Arnold Philip Bentley, Consultant, The Royal British Legion Village, Aylesford, Kent
- Hugh Bentall Berridge, chairman and Chief Executive, Berridge Environmental Laboratories Ltd.
- Alan Bertram, Chief Inspector, Metropolitan Police.
- Roger Anthony Black. For services to Athletics.
- Miss Jean Brown Blackadder, Headteacher, Buckstone Primary School, Edinburgh.
- Thomas Eric Blackman, Manager, Radiological Safety Department, Health and Safety Division, Winfrith Technology Centre, UKAEA.
- Ailsa Jean, Mrs. Blair, lately Regional Organiser, Tayside Women's Royal Voluntary Service.
- Miss Elizabeth Margaret Blunt, lately West African Correspondent, British Broadcasting Corporation World Service.
- Edward Boden, lately Head of Publications, British Veterinary Association.
- James Stanley Seymour Bond. For services to the community in Pinner, Middlesex.
- Miss Mary Halford Bonham. For services to the blind.
- Dennis Arthur Boreham, River Controller, National Rivers Authority.
- Edward Leech Bowen. For services to agriculture in Tarporley, Cheshire.
- Miss Audrey Katherine Bradley, Section Officer, Housing Benefits, Housing Department, Birmingham City Council.
- Thomas Brennan, lately Shop Steward, Ravenscraig Steelworks, British Steel.
- Peter John Charles Brewer, Divisional Surveyor (Newton Abbot), Devon County Council.
- Jean Muriel, Mrs. Bridle, Senior Personal Secretary, Office of the Minister for the Civil Service.
- Leslie Ronald Brown, Independent Food Retailer.
- Pamela Margaret, Mrs. Bryant, chairman, League of Friends, Teddington Memorial Hospital.
- Eileen, Mrs. Bulbrook, Executive Officer, Department of Health.
- John Roy Bullock, Engineering Manager, Littlebrook Power Station, National Power.
- Gerald Burke, lately Director of Housing and Health, West Lancashire District Council.
- Cecil Howard Burton, chairman, League of Friends, Nuneaton Hospitals.
- John George Bussey, chairman, North of Scotland War Pensions Committee.
- John Colin Butler, Senior Project Manager, Current Class Projects, Rolls-Royce and Associates Ltd.
- Joan Eisten, Mrs. Cameron, Provost, Bearsden and Milngavie District Council.
- Henry James Carne, General Medical Practitioner, London. Senior Lecturer in General Practice, St Bartholomew's and the Royal London Hospital Medical Schools.
- Donald Gordon Carrington, Regional Collector, Board of Inland Revenue.
- Robert James Cartwright. For political and public service.
- Irene, Mrs. Chandler, co-founder, the Travel Club, Upminster, Essex.
- Miss Vanessa Jane Chandler, Personal Secretary, Foreign and Commonwealth Office.
- Derek Austin Chappell, Technical Designer, Royal Postgraduate Medical School, University of London.
- Susanna Mary, Mrs. Cheal, Executive Vice President, BLISS, Baby Life Support Systems.
- Warwick Harold Child. For political and public service.
- Herbert Morgan Clavery, Honorary Captain, South Shields Volunteer Life Brigade.
- Barbara Mary, Mrs. Clewer, Vice-chairman, Wales, Women's Royal Voluntary Service.
- James Bernard Connor, Divisional Officer 1, London Fire Brigade.
- Donald Howard Coombe, Founder and chairman, Coombe Holiday Trust Fund.
- Miss Joan Cooper, Founder Member and chairman, South Glamorgan Crossroads Care Attendant Scheme.
- Alan Cottam, lately Head Verger, Sheffield Cathedral.
- Audrey Kathleen, Mrs. Court, vice-president, Brook Advisory Centres.
- Alexandra, Mrs. Cowie. For services to Women's Squash.
- Dorothy Ann, Mrs. Craig, National Federation of Consumer Groups.
- Peter Martin Craven, Senior Information Officer, Central Office of Information.
- Joan Madeleine, Mrs. Gregeen. For services to the British Red Cross Society in Scotland.
- Terence Brian (Terry) Croft, Manager, Department of Animal and Plant Sciences, University of Sheffield. For rescue services following the Gulf War.
- Miss Ellen Cross. For political and public service.
- Vera Mary Bessie, Mrs. Crow, vice-president, Royal Air Force Airfield Construction Officers' Association.
- The Reverend Robert Edward Cubbon, lately Chaplain of the House of Keys, Isle of Man.
- Bryan Cowan Shirras Currie, Chief Maintenance Support Engineer, British Aerospace (Dynamics) Ltd.
- Wilfrid Bruce Davis, chairman, Macmillan Service, Cornwall.
- Anthony Scott Davy. For services to West Yorkshire and West Midlands Residuary Bodies.
- Robert Llewellyn Denney, chairman, Age Concern, Kettering.
- Roy Henry Dennis. For services to nature conservation in the Scottish Highlands.
- George Devadason, Stores Officer B, Ordnance Survey.
- Barbara Joyce, Mrs. Dewhirst, Doncaster LEA Appraisal Co-ordinator, formerly Head Teacher, Windhill Junior and Infant School, Mexborough.
- Elizabeth, Mrs. Dibbens, Senior Personal Secretary, Board of Customs and Excise.
- David Noel Donnelly, managing director, Armwell Engineering Ltd.
- Lyn Miner Downes, Chief Executive, Three Counties Agricultural Society.
- Margaret Alma Swift, Mrs. Downey, lately Deputy President, Humberside Branch, British Red Cross Society.
- John Downing, Chief Photographer, Daily Express.
- Miss Sarah Margaret Dymott, Head of Nursing Services, Esso Petroleum.
- Eric James Eden, lately Engineer (Signalling and Control Systems), London Underground Ltd.
- Heather, Mrs. Edwards, Revenue Executive, Board of Inland Revenue.
- Brian Ellis, Technical Director, Blandburgh Nemo Ltd.
- Miss Daphne Jean Ellis, Senior Nurse, Granard House Ward, The Royal Marsden Hospital, London.
- Miss Iris Florence Evans, lately Executive Officer, Department of Trade and Industry.
- Margaret Laura, Mrs. Evans, County Organiser, Surrey Women's Royal Voluntary Service.
- Ronald John Evans, Senior Executive Officer, Department of Employment.
- William John Evans. For services to the community in Merthyr Tydfil.
- Hugh David Facey, chairman and managing director, Estate Wire Ltd.
- Peter Fellows, lately Senior Probation Officer, Devon Probation Service.
- Rodney George Fenn, Higher Executive Officer, Department of Education and Science.
- Robin Kelsey Fewings, County Commissioner, Wiltshire County, The Scout Association.
- Charles William Fine, Information Specialist, Support Centre for People with Disabilities, IBM UK.
- Miss Robina Zoe Finlay. For political service.
- Hedley Finn, chairman, Radio Lollipop.
- Christina Josephine, Mrs. Gadsdon, Chairman of Governors, Barstable Comprehensive School, Basildon, Essex.
- Elizabeth Loraine, Mrs. Gammie. For political service.
- Miss Prudence Mary Gates, Senior Executive Officer, Ministry of Defence.
- Miss Janet Cecilia Gerrish, lately Project Nurse, Bristol Royal Infirmary precinct redevelopment.
- Rhona, Mrs. Gilbertson, Headteacher, Tywyn Primary School, Port Talbot, West Glamorgan.
- David Newlands Gilchrist. For services to the seed potato industry.
- Mavis Eleanor, Mrs. Gildea, lately Area Speech Therapist, Eastern Health and Social Services Board.
- Miss Annette Dorothy Gladwin, Personal Assistant and Private Secretary to the chairman, British Steel plc.
- Charles Ainley Goddard, Senior Lecturer, Huddersfield Technical College. For services to Export.
- Joyce Irene, Mrs. Godwin. For political service.
- Vanda, Mrs. Golder, Organiser, Sittingbourne Branch of The Save the Children Fund.
- Alan David Goldman, chairman and Chief Executive, The Sage Group plc.
- Ralph Eric Gordon, General Manager and Director, North Devon Electronics Ltd.
- Albert George Gould, Senior Professional and Technology Officer, Department of the Environment.
- Ernest William Grange. For services to the community in Loughton, Essex.
- Peter David Gratton. For services to librarianship.
- Michael Gray, Marine Services Officer 2, Ministry of Defence.
- Ian Francis Green, Second Secretary, (Grade DS7E), Foreign and Commonwealth Office.
- Jack Guest, Force Welfare Officer, Devon and Cornwall Constabulary.
- Kenneth Hale, Director (Technical and European Affairs), National Council of Building Material Producers.
- Dilys, Mrs. Hall. For services to the community in Wigan.
- Miss Elizabeth Sara Graham Hall, Administrator, Dental Department, British Postgraduate Medical Federation.
- Valerie Constance, Mrs. Hall, lately Senior Personal Secretary, Ministry of Defence.
- Miss Doreen Brenda Hancock, Director, Social Policy Department, Equal Opportunities Commission.
- Alan Hancox, artistic director, The Cheltenham Festival of Literature.
- John Irwin Harris. For services to pharmacy.
- John Duncan Harrison, Liaison Engineer, Travers Morgan Consulting Group.
- Joseph John Hart, Associate, Bridge Division, Mott MacDonald Group.
- Joseph Jeffries Harvey, lately managing director, J. J. Harvey (Manchester) Ltd.
- Stuart Cameron Henderson, Temporary Detective Chief Superintendent, Lothian and Borders Police.
- Angela, Mrs. Hendra. For services to sport for the Disabled in Northern Ireland.
- Grace Colville, Mrs. Herbert, Secretary, Northern Ireland District Branch, Soldiers', Sailors' and Airmen's Families Association.
- John Holmes, lately Senior Animal Health Officer, Ministry of Agriculture, Fisheries and Food.
- Theodore Buchanan Hooper, Welfare Officer, National Union of Journalists, Nottingham.
- Michael Thomas Horwood, Member, Berkshire, Buckinghamshire and Oxfordshire Naturalists' Trust.
- Ernest Arthur Houghton, Director and Company Secretary, Shropshire Enterprise Trust Ltd.
- Cyril Howarth, Band Manager, Williams Fairey Engineering Brass Band.
- Edwin Nairn Hunter, managing director, Penman Engineering Ltd., Heathhall, Dumfries.
- Miss Joyce Catherine Huntingford, lately Higher Executive Officer, Lord Chancellor's Department.
- Bernard James Hyde. For services to the public and to the community in Bedfordshire.
- David Inight. For political and public service.
- Derek Edgar Ireland, Higher Professional and Technology Officer, Ministry of Defence.
- Jessie Munro McMurdo, Mrs. Ireland, Senior Clinical Medical Officer, Argyll and Clyde Health Board.
- John Christopher Irgin, General Manager, Settlements, National Grid Company.
- John Black Jack, Principal Teacher of Technical Education, Alness Academy.
- Alan Jackson, Senior Valuation Executive, Board of Inland Revenue.
- James Beattie Jackson, lately Business Manager, Hot Rolled Products, Shepcote Lane Works, British Steel Stainless.
- Peter Hugh Beaumont Jackson, Support Services Manager, Technology Centre, Dowty Group plc.
- Ann, Mrs. Jenkins, Headteacher, Blaenavon Hillside Nursery School.
- Simon Jenkins, General Medical Practitioner, Bury, Lancashire.
- Robin Michael Jenkinson, Divisional Officer, Surrey Fire and Rescue Service.
- William John Johnston, Chief Superintendent, Royal Ulster Constabulary.
- Arthur Tudor Jones, Regional Quality Manager, British Gas plc., Wales.
- David Jones, Area Manager, Southern Region, British Railways.
- David Jones, lately Commercial Director, South London Transport Ltd.
- David Ivor Jones, vice-president, Disabled Drivers' Association.
- William Kenneth Jones, Higher Executive Officer, Department of Social Security.
- Marian, Mrs. Judge. For services to The Wakefield Ladies' Lifeboat Guild.
- Neil Powell Judge, Leader, South Holland District Council.
- Joyce Dorothy, Mrs. Kerr. For political and public service.
- Violet Ivy, Mrs. Klavins, Ward Manager, Wandsworth Health Authority.
- Alan Clifford Knight, Senior Executive Officer Department of Social Security.
- Muriel Constance, Mrs. Lancaster, Clinical Nurse Specialist (Orthopaedics), Solihull Hospital.
- Janet, Mrs. Langmead. For services to the community in West Sussex.
- Frederick William Law. For services to the Scout Movement in Lancashire.
- Maureen, Mrs. Leach, Founder and Secretary, Sheffield Branch of Birthright.
- Horace Edward Legg, lately Assistant Manager, Property Services Department, Navy, Army and Air Force Institute.
- Heather Neave, Mrs. Leigh. For political and public service.
- George Levy, chairman, Friends of the Iveagh Bequest, Kenwood.
- Stanley Edward Lightowler, Senior Systems Analyst, Department of the Environment, Northern Ireland.
- Miss Po Choo Lim, Associate Specialist in Obstetrics and Gynaecology, West Dorset Health Authority.
- Griffith Clive Henry Lloyd, Chief Superintendent, West Midlands Police.
- Desmond Joseph Logan, Senior Executive Officer, Board of Customs and Excise.
- Harry Lovatt, Joint Chief Executive Officer, United Norwest Co-operatives Ltd.
- David Luke, lately Special Assignments Manager, Local Enterprise Development Unit.
- Nan, Mrs. Luney, Clinical Nurse Manager, Surgical Unit, Crosshouse Hospital.
- Miss Zeller Alexandra Macrae Macdougall, Personal Assistant to Director and Institute Personnel Officer, Agricultural and Food Research Council, Institute of Animal Physiology and Genetics.
- Norman MacLeod Mackenzie, General Dental Practitioner, Glasgow.
- Bernard Maddison. For services to the community in Milton Keynes, Buckinghamshire.
- George Edward Mann, Technical Consultant, Blue Star Ship Management Ltd.
- Pamela Betty, Mrs. Mansfield, lately Manager, Killigrew Day Centre for the elderly, Falmouth.
- Anthony Philip Mason, Production Technician, GEC Avionics Ltd., Rochester.
- James Mclntosh McCabe. For political service.
- Miss Eileen McCallum, Actress.
- Patricia May, Mrs. McCann, Higher Executive Officer, Department of Employment.
- Elizabeth, Mrs. McColgan. For services to Athletics.
- David Frederick McDonough, Immigration Officer, Home Office.
- Vincent McFadden, Detective Chief Superintendent, Surrey Constabulary.
- Miss Agnes Janet Templeton McLeish, Manager, Theatre Sterile Supplies Unit, Bridge of Earn Hospital.
- Nora Fisher, Mrs. McMillan. For services to museums and natural history.
- Miss Catherine McNeil, Higher Executive Officer, Procurator Fiscal Service.
- William McStay, lately Administrator, Northern Ireland Council for Voluntary Action.
- Atholl Stewart Menzies, Higher Executive Officer, Department of Social Security.
- James Norman Milligan, Organist and Choirmaster, Her Majesty's Prison, Lancaster.
- Miss Patricia Lilian Mills, Inspector of Taxes (S), Board of Inland Revenue.
- June Maureen, Mrs. Mitchell, Health Visitor to Asian Families, South West Hertfordshire Health Authority.
- Albert Molineux, lately The Senior Executive Officer, Joint Matriculation Board.
- Miss Ena Molineux, Head Teacher, Moorfield Junior School, Stockport.
- John Moon, lately Higher Professional and Technology Officer, Technical Services, Plymouth Marine Laboratory.
- Ann, Mrs. Moore, Local Organiser, Cancer Research Campaign, Shetland.
- William Henry John Mordy. For political service.
- Ronald William Henry Morgan, lately Higher Professional and Technology Officer, Science Engineering Research Council.
- Martin Hugh Morris, lately Chief Reporter, Ross Gazette, Ross on Wye.
- Christopher Morton. For services to Motorcycle Speedway Racing.
- Joseph Murray, Project Manager, Marconi Command and Control Systems Ltd.
- Michael Anthony Nadin. For services to youth in London.
- John Hanna Napier, Business Development Manager, Matthew Hall Engineering.
- Iris Lily, Mrs. Nedderman, chairman, Hampshire Voluntary Housing Society.
- Robert Loudon Neil, lately Station Manager Brunei, Services' Sound and Vision Corporation.
- John Brian Noble, Senior Executive Officer, Crown Prosecution Service.
- Guy Dennis Stanley Northcott, lately Grade 7, Department of Transport.
- Isobel Margaret, Mrs. O'Dowd, Secretary, Fernagh Tenants' Association.
- Molly Eileen, Mrs. Owen, Director, Cardiff Chamber of Commerce and Industry.
- Albert Palliser, Governor 4, Her Majesty's Prison, Shrewsbury.
- Anthony Peter Palmer, Staff Nurse, Great Yarmouth and Waveney Health Authority, Anglian Harbours NHS Trust (Lothingland).
- Harold Leslie Palmer, Voluntary Worker, Her Majesty's Prison, Birmingham.
- Miss Mary Irene Park. For services to disabled people and elderly people in Moffat, Dumfriesshire.
- Michael Geoffrey Parr. For political service.
- Dick Wallace Passmore, Farmer. For services to agricultural education and to conservation.
- Hannah Frew, Mrs. Paterson. For services to embroidery.
- Thomas Penny, chairman, West and South West Midlands War Pensions Committee.
- Leslie George Pettet, Pay Band 10, Her Majesty's Stationery Office.
- Richard Phythian, General Secretary, National Association of Fire Officers.
- Doris Muriel, Mrs. Pine. For political and public service.
- Anthony Brian Plant, Business Manager, Electronic Systems Division, Lucas Aerospace Ltd.
- Elizabeth, Mrs. Pollock, lately Senior Personnel Officer, Production Resources and Engineering, British Broadcasting Corporation, Northern Ireland.
- Betty Maud, Mrs. Popham, Vice-chairman, Bury Health Authority.
- Patricia Elsie, Mrs. Pott, Assistant Secretary, President's Office, Institute of Chartered Accountants in England and Wales.
- Douglas Victor Pye. For political service.
- Eric Radcliffe, Chief Surveyor, Channel Tunnel Project.
- Ernest Reginald Randall, General Secretary, Association of Combined Youth Clubs.
- Donald Redman. For services to Schools' Swimming.
- Tommy Reilly, Harmonica player. For services to music.
- Robert Thomas Rendle, Senior Professional and Technology Officer, Ministry of Defence.
- Alec Louis Ricketts. For public services in the City of Bath.
- Miss Mary Finlay Robertson, Housing Welfare Officer, Glenrothes Development Corporation.
- Ivor Robinson, Bookbinder.
- William Paterson Rodgers. For political service.
- Michael Joseph Anthony Rooney, Higher Scientific Officer, Department of Agriculture, Northern Ireland.
- Miss Jean Christine Rowles, Principal County Librarian, Avon.
- Gordon Savage. For services to the West Cumbrian Branch of the Parachute Regimental Association.
- Margaret (Isobel), Mrs. Sayer, Headteacher, Firthmoor Infants and Nursery School, Darlington.
- Colin Seabrook, Director, Group Research and Development, J H Fenner and Co Ltd.
- Captain Roland James Sewell, Construction Adviser, Salvation Army (UK) and OXFAM.
- Archibald Sharkie, British Team Leader, Skill Olympics.
- John (Iain) Sinclair, Auxiliary Lieutenant, Orkney Royal Naval Auxiliary Service.
- John Owen Slaymaker, lately Carmarthenshire County Secretary, Farmers' Union of Wales.
- Donald Murdo Smith, Factor, Storaoway Trust Estate.
- Hugh Smith, managing director, Albyn of Stonehaven Ltd. For services to Export.
- Norman Fowden Smith. For political and public service.
- Miss Sheila Irene Sowerbutts, Division Commissioner, North Cotswold Division, The Girl Guides' Association.
- Richard David Squires, Secretary, North Russia Club.
- John Charles Stammers. For services to the community in Braemar.
- Elisabeth Florence Carina, Mrs. Standen, Officer for People with Disabilities (Employment), Bristol City Council.
- George Steven, assistant director for Social Programmes, Scotland Salvation Army.
- Patricia Helen, Mrs. Stewart, Principal, P H Stewart Associates.
- Leslie Robert Stocker, Founder and chairman, The Wildlife Hospital Trust, Aylesbury, Buckinghamshire.
- Hubert Murray Sturges. For services to sport for disabled people.
- Jack Symons, President, The Lakeland Sinfonia Concert Society.
- William Raymond Tancred. For services to Athletics.
- Thomas Taylor, managing director, Diana Cowpe Ltd., Burnley.
- Vivienne, Mrs. Taylor, Volunteer for the Community Education Service, Great Missenden.
- Miss Honor Thackrah, (Mrs. Southern), lately Orchestra Manager, Royal Opera House.
- Brian Thomas, chairman and managing director, Metrotect Ltd.
- Alan Thompson, Senior Information Officer, Welsh Office.
- Miss Agnes Anderson Thomson, chairperson, Philemon Housing Association.
- Kenneth Toon, chairman, South Derbyshire No. 1 Miners' Welfare Scheme.
- Morfudd, Mrs. Tudor, Lay Member, Rural Dispensing Committee.
- Geoffrey Turnbull, chairman, GT Group Ltd. For services to Export.
- Arthur Barry Charles Turner, Member, London Borough of Harrow Council.
- Joan, Mrs. Tyrrell, Executive Officer, Department of Social Security.
- Captain Gordon Sidney Varney, Chief Harbour Master, Port of London Authority.
- David Harper Vaughan, Senior Education Officer, Western Education and Library Board.
- Kenneth Stephen Vause, BEM, Employment Officer, The Regular Forces' Employment Association.
- Hilda Dods, Mrs. Waddell, Head Occupational Therapist, Cardiff Royal Infirmary.
- Miss Mary Brigid Waldron, Senior Nurse (Health Promotions and Special Projects), Liverpool, Community and Priority Service Unit.
- Beryl, Mrs. Walkden, Manager, Mansfield Citizens' Advice Bureau.
- Louise, Mrs. Aitken-Walker, Motor Rally Driver.
- Vivian Isabella, Mrs. Walker. For political service.
- Reginald Thomas Warboys, Principal Doorkeeper, House of Commons.
- Michael John Watham, Higher Executive Officer, Ministry of Defence.
- Leslie Alfred Webb, lately Area Commissioner, London District, St. John Ambulance Brigade.
- Marion, Mrs. Welchman. For services to the British Dyslexia Association.
- John Douglas Welsh, Detective Chief Superintendent, Strathclyde Police.
- Elizabeth Anne Mary, Mrs. Wharton, Executive Officer, Ministry of Defence.
- Mary Louisa, Mrs. Wheeler, President, MidSussex Branch of the MENCAP Society.
- Denis Patrick White, Executive Officer, Department of Employment.
- Gerald Ewart White, Group Controller, Exeter Group, United Kingdom Warning and Monitoring Organisation.
- Miss Frances Mary Whitticase, Secretary, Royal Association of British Dairy Farmers.
- Bryan Richard Wilden, Housing Officer, South West Regional Office, British Waterways Board.
- Stephen Wilkinson, Conductor, British Broadcasting Corporation Northern Singers and William Byrd Singers.
- Geoffrey Ralph Wilks, Senior Valuer, Board of Inland Revenue.
- Desmond Reuben Willcox, lately Chief Executive, Plymouth Branch of the Young Men's Christian Association.
- Miss Eluned Elizabeth Williams, former Project Leader, Ardwyn National Children's Home, Dinas Powys, South Glamorgan.
- John Edward Aubrey Williams, lately Headteacher, Wistaston Berkeley County Primary School, Nantwich.
- John Joseph Williams, managing director, Industrial Services Consortium Sheltered Workshop, Bradford.
- Andrew Wilson, lately Livestock Officer, Livestock Division, Scottish Milk Marketing Board.
- Wendy, Mrs. Witter, chairman, Humberside Committee for the Employment of Disabled People.
- Lieutenant Commander Harold Eric Wood, (R.N.R.) (Ret'd.) Chairman, Kent Association of Parish Councils. For services to the public and to the community in Kent.
- Frank Macpherson Woodsford, Honorary Appeals Organiser and Honorary Assistant Secretary, Bournemouth War Memorial Homes.
- Ian Woosnam. For services to Golf.
- Beryl, Mrs. Wright, Executive Officer, Department of Employment.
- Frederick Arthur Yates, managing director, Frederick A. Yates (Engineers) Ltd. For services to industry in the West Midlands.
- Maurice Edgar Edward Yates, lately chairman, Civil Service Pensioners' Alliance.

Diplomatic Service and Overseas List

- Mohamed Amin. For services to photography and journalism in East Africa.
- Samuel Anchor. For services to the British community in Panama.
- Nicholas Valentine Durand Baker. For services to British interests in Costa Rica.
- Timothy John Bayly. For services to the British community in Peru.
- Alexander Leonard Frank Bessey, lately Honorary British Consul, Ouagadougou, Burkina.
- Edward Phil Anthony Brewer, lately Chief Security Officer, H.M. Embassy Moscow.
- Alan Leslie Brown. For services to the community in Bermuda.
- Ian Adare Brown, lately Reviser, Translation Service, NATO HQ Brussels.
- Miss Gloria Hope Carby, Secretary, British High Commission, Kingston.
- William Cham Wai-lim, Assistant Principal Immigration Officer, Immigration Department, Hong Kong.
- Vicwood Chong Kee-ting. For community services in Hong Kong.
- Choy Young, Principal Judicial Clerk, Hong Kong.
- Rosemary Protase Hepburn McDavitt, Mrs. Clarke, Vice-Consul, H.M. Embassy, Bahrain.
- Miss Patricia Coales. For services to English teaching in Trieste.
- Margaret Gladys, Mrs. Coleman. For services to the British community in Buenos Aires.
- Benjamin Cottam, Vice-Consul, British Consulate, Malaga.
- James Thorn Grain, Commercial Officer, British Consulate-General, Melbourne.
- Arthur Ney Cushing. For services to journalism in Oman.
- Louise Alexandra Metzgen, Mrs. De Fortin, Personal Assistant to H.M. Ambassador, Tegucigalpa.
- Cecil Wendell Woodrow Emery. For public services in Bermuda.
- Miss Majorie Ena Emmanuel, lately Secretary, EC commission, Brussels.
- Miss Jane Flower, Secretary, Defence Section, H.M. Embassy, Lisbon.
- Jacqueline Lesley, Mrs. Fox, Personal Assistant, Economic Section, H.M. Embassy, Athens.
- Joyce Evelyn, Mrs. Frascona. For services to the British community in Illinois, U.S.A.
- Ian Gilbert Gibson. For services to veterinary training in Zimbabwe.
- Roger Arthur Gough, Honorary British Consul, Belo Horizonte, Brazil.
- Coral Christina, Mrs. Gouveia, Assistant Commercial Officer, British High Commission, Port of Spain.
- William Edward Grayson, Communications Officer, H.M. Embassy, Moscow.
- Herbert Henry Harding. For services to exservicemen in Antwerp.
- George Kenneth Harrigan, Comptroller of Customs, Anguilla.
- George Albert Manuel Hills. For services to writing and journalism in Spain.
- Thomas Cranston Hughes BEM, For welfare services to orphans in Dharan, Nepal.
- David Arthur Hunt, assistant director of Marine, Hong Kong.
- Chasser Robertson Jessop, Honorary British Consul, Bamako, Mali.
- John Marcus Lewis, lately Assistant Administration Officer, British Mission, Berlin.
- Li Shiu-tong, Assistant Regional Commander, Civil Aid Services, Hong Kong.
- Major Norman John Lister, Honorary British Consul, Trieste.
- Moira Anne, Mrs. Macauliffe, Vice-Consul, British Consulate, Valparaiso.
- Berna Lavonne, Mrs. Murphy. For services to commerce and the community in the Cayman Islands.
- Ng Him-wo, J.P., Assistant Commissioner, Inland Revenue Department, Hong Kong.
- Lillian, Mrs. Ng, Kwan Mun Chun, Assistant Registrar, British Trade Commission, Hong Kong.
- John Richard O'Sullivan, lately Chief Security Officer, U.K. Delegation to N.A.T.O., Brussels.
- Valerie Ann, Mrs. Phillips. For services to the British community in Rio de Janeiro.
- Farouk Abdul Ramjahn, Departmental Secretary, City and New Territories Administration, Hong Kong.
- William Francis Reid. For services to the British community in Santiago.
- Miss Elizabeth Batson Richards. For services to education in Paraguay.
- The Reverend Lancelot Michael Rodgrigues. For welfare services to the community in Macau.
- Peter Ernest Roffey, Second Secretary (Consular), British High Commission, Islamabad.
- Joseph Santos. For services to the community in Gibraltar.
- George Craig Smith. For services to the community in Parana State, Brazil.
- John Michael Smith, Director, British Council, Oporto.
- Ian John Strange, Wildlife and Conservation Adviser, Falkland Islands.
- Ralph Vaz. For services to British commercial and community interests in Lisbon.
- Robin Maclean Webster, RD, lately Puisne Judge, Kingdom of Tonga.
- Dora Margaret, Mrs. Whitman. For welfare services to the community in Jordan.
- Charles Henry Martin Wildblood. For services to the British community in Amsterdam.
- Commander Alan Young, RN, (Retd.), Honorary R.N. Liaison Officer, Fort Lauderdale, Florida.

=== Imperial Service Order (ISO) ===
Home Civil Service

- Robert Clarke Ace, Inspector of Taxes (SP), Board of Inland Revenue.
- Miss Patricia Braunton, Grade 7, Department of Transport.
- Roger Henry Bryant, Grade 7, Department of Social Security.
- Pamela, Mrs. David, Grade 7, Department of Employment.
- Robert Booth Fulton, Grade 6, Greenmount College of Agriculture and Horticulture, Northern Ireland.
- Richard Langley Harris, Grade 6, Ministry of Defence.
- Ronald Lees, Grade 6, Department of Trade and Industry.
- John Reville Lupton, Grade 7, Ministry of Agriculture, Fisheries and Food.
- Robert Frederick John May, Grade 7, Department of Transport.
- Peter Maydom, lately Grade 7, Ministry of Agriculture, Fisheries and Food.
- Douglas McQueen, Grade 6, Home Office.
- Philip Patrick Mulligan, Inspector of Taxes (P), Board of Inland Revenue.
- Michael Keith Nethercott, Grade 6, Ministry of Defence.
- John Arthur Payne, lately Grade 7, Paymaster General's Office.
- Raymond Quinlan, Inspector of Taxes (SP), Board of Inland Revenue.
- Ronald Albert Reginald Sanders, Grade 7, Board of Customs and Excise.
- Roy Saville, Grade 7, Department of Employment.
- Roy Vickers Smith, Grade 7, Department of Trade and Industry.
- James Tarvit, Deputy Chief Inspector of Sea Fisheries, Scottish Office.
- James Geoffrey Trotter, Inspector of Taxes (P), Board of Inland Revenue.
- Ewen Cameron Watt, Grade 6, Ministry of Defence.
- Joseph Henry Wormald, Grade 6, Department of Health.

Diplomatic Service and Overseas List

- Dr. Chau Tuen-yin, JP, Director of Hospital Services, Hong Kong.
- Miss Cheung Man-yee, JP, Director of Broadcasting, Hong Kong.
- Paul Jeremy Corser, JP, Director of Architectural Services, Hong Kong.
- Ketsing Taty Kuo, JP, Director of Drainage Services, Hong Kong.

=== British Empire Medal (BEM) ===
Military Division

Royal Navy

- Chief Petty Officer Writer John Edwin Baker
- Colour Sergeant Kenneth William Bowen, Royal Marines
- Chief Petty Officer (Seaman) Gary Roy Leslie Brooks
- Charge Chief Marine Engineering Artificer (P) Ronald Charles Coles
- Chief Petty Officer Writer Peter Reginald Cornish
- Chief Petty Officer Marine Engineering Artificer (M) Roy Ivan Goram
- Petty Officer (Diver) Paul Guiver
- Chief Petty Officer Marine Engineering Artificer (L) Anthony Eric Habgood
- Chief Medical Technician Keith Hall
- Chief Marine Engineering Mechanic (M) Michael Keith Jones
- Chief Wren (Operations) (Weapon Analyst) Margaret Ann McKernan
- Chief Petty Officer Writer John Joseph Noone
- Petty Officer (now Chief Petty Officer) (Seaman) Anthony Charles Orchard
- Chief Petty Officer Marine Engineering Artificer (P) Stephen John Sandel
- Sergeant Charles Reginald Spooner, Royal Marines Reserve.
- Chief Wren Writer Ann Marie Stewart, Women's Royal Naval Reserve.
- Charge Chief Marine Engineering Artificer (P) Norman Edward Vivian Taviner

Army

- Staff Sergeant Gordon Baird, Corps of Royal Military Police, Territorial Army.
- Staff Sergeant Mark Simon Baker, Corps of Royal Electrical and Mechanical Engineers.
- Staff Sergeant Philip John Baker, The Royal Hussars (Prince of Wales's Own).
- Staff Sergeant Phillip Ball, Corps of Royal Military Police.
- Corporal Ronald Brill, The Queen's Regiment.
- Sergeant Andrew Timothy Britain, Royal Army Ordnance Corps.
- Staff Sergeant John Howard Brooks, Corps of Royal Engineers, Territorial Army.
- Corporal Terence James Roy Brothers, Corps of Royal Engineers.
- Sergeant Martin Edmund Browne, Welsh Guards.
- Corporal Brian Burns, Corps of Royal Engineers.
- Staff Sergeant Timothy John Butler, Royal Army Medical Corps.
- Sergeant Alan Terence Cain, Royal Corps of Transport.
- Lance Corporal Leslie Michael Carr, Royal Pioneer Corps.
- Sergeant Nigel Simon Chandler, Corps of Royal Electrical and Mechanical Engineers, Territorial Army.
- Sergeant Ian Clarke, Royal Corps of Signals.
- Lance Corporal Jeremy Ian Colligan, Royal Corps of Transport.
- Corporal Jacqueline Darke, Queen Alexandra's Royal Army Nursing Corps.
- Staff Sergeant Trevor Stewart Darley, Intelligence Corps.
- Corporal Phillip Barry Donegan, Royal Corps of Transport.
- Staff Sergeant John David Dunn, Royal Corps of Transport, Territorial Army.
- Corporal Eileen Elizabeth Fawcett, Women's Royal Army Corps.
- Staff Sergeant Brian Leslie Fielding, Royal Pioneer Corps.
- Sergeant Stephen Russell Garton, Intelligence Corps.
- Corporal Thomas Brian Gibson, Royal Corps of Transport.
- Staff Sergeant Nigel Grant, Royal Corps of Signals.
- Staff Sergeant Sylvia Gray, Women's Royal Army Corps.
- Sergeant Ian Richard Greaves, The Duke of Wellington's Regiment (West Riding).
- Staff Sergeant Peter Jefferson Hallewell, The Parachute Regiment.
- Staff Sergeant Philip Alan Headford, Royal Regiment of Artillery.
- Corporal Marianne Caroline Henderson, Women's Royal Army Corps.
- Staff Sergeant (now Warrant Officer Class 2) Peter Anthony Jablonski, 16th/5th The Queen's Royal Lancers.
- Sergeant Mark James, Royal Army Ordnance Corps.
- Sergeant Stephen Jewell, The Green Howards (Alexandra Princess of Wales's Own Yorkshire Regiment)
- Corporal Lalprasad Gurung, 2nd King Edward VIFs Own Gurkha Rifles (The Sirmoor Rifles)
- Staff Sergeant Peter Leach, The Green Howards (Alexandra Princess of Wales's Own Yorkshire Regiment)
- Sergeant Mark Andrew Long, Army Catering Corps.
- Staff Sergeant Ian McCallum, Queen's Own Highlanders (Seaforth and Camerons)
- Staff Sergeant Peter Buckland McKeown, The King's Regiment, Territorial Army.
- Sergeant Ian Jonathon Mitchell, Royal Corps of Transport.
- Corporal Charles McMillan Neilson, Queen's Own Highlanders (Seaforth and Camerons).
- Staff Sergeant Peter O'Toole, The Parachute Regiment, Territorial Army.
- Staff Sergeant Paul Pettit, Scots Guards.
- Staff Sergeant William Edwin Phillips, The Parachute Regiment.
- Sergeant John Pickford, The Royal Green Jackets.
- Corporal Steven John Richards, Royal Pioneer Corps.
- Staff Sergeant Steven John Robertson, Corps of Royal Engineers.
- Corporal Douglas John Kenneth Saunders, The Royal Anglian Regiment, Territorial Army.
- Staff Sergeant Robert John Scott, QGM, Royal Army Ordnance Corps.
- Lance Corporal Roy Sellstrom, Royal Pioneer Corps.
- Sergeant Jonathan Andrew Shutt, Corps of Royal Electrical and Mechanical Engineers.
- Staff Sergeant Antony Wallis Smith, The Worcestershire and Sherwood Foresters Regiment (29th/45th Foot), Territorial Army.
- Staff Sergeant Frederick John Smith, Royal Corps of Signals.
- Sergeant Mark Anthony Raphael Staples, Royal Pioneer Corps.
- Sergeant Robert Henry Stephenson, Royal Corps of Transport.
- Sergeant Simon Edwin Thomassen-Kinsey. Army Air Corps.
- Sergeant Tong Shu Wah, Hong Kong Military Service Corps.
- Sergeant Denis Robert Tope, Royal Corps of Signals.
- Staff Sergeant Anthony Gerrard Noel Van Dort, Corps of Royal Electrical and Mechanical Engineers.
- Corporal Kenneth Walton, Royal Corps of Transport, Territorial Army.
- Corporal John Wardley, Royal Corps of Signals.
- Corporal Nigel Stephen Warner, The Queen's Regiment.
- Staff Sergeant Clyde Emanuel White, Army Physical Training Corps.
- Lance Corporal John Whittle, Army Catering Corps, Territorial Army.
- Staff Sergeant Neil Wilson, 1st The Queen's Dragoon Guards.
- Staff Sergeant Gordon Alexander Wood, Corps of Royal Engineers.
- Sergeant Helen Young, Women's Royal Army Corps.

Royal Air Force

- Sergeant Alan Bateman
- Sergeant David John Boldy
- Sergeant John Gerard Brimley
- Flight Sergeant Christine Brooks, Women's Royal Air Force.
- Chief Technician David Reginald Hyde Evely
- Corporal (now Sergeant) Martin Harris
- Chief Technician John Lawrence Haylock
- Chief Technician John Malcolm Holland
- Flight Sergeant Anthony Albert Hurd
- Flight Sergeant Peter John Hurt
- Flight Sergeant Victor Edwin Ingledew
- Chief Technician Martin Francis Lynskey
- Chief Technician Philip Thomas McCabe
- Flight Sergeant John Gilbert Fergusson McMath
- Chief Technician Robert Orange
- Chief Technician Benjamin John O'Sullivan
- Flight Sergeant Dallas James Payne
- Sergeant Gordon Stirling Robertson
- Flight Sergeant Michael John Short
- Chief Technician Richard John Simms
- Chief Technician Gordon Thompson
- Chief Technician Barry Leslie Trodd
- Flight Sergeant Kenneth Andrew Walker

Civil Division

- Keith Macarty Ainsworth, Training Manager, Shell U.K. Exploration and Production.
- Norman Reginald Alexander. For services to countryside conservation in Northumberland.
- Raymond Allison, lately Civic Centre Manager, Sunderland Borough Council.
- Aubrey Anderson, Permanent Way Inspector, Northern Ireland Railways.
- Phyllis, Mrs. Anderson-Dixon, Revenue Assistant, Board of Inland Revenue.
- John Oxwith Andrews, Auxiliary Coastguard-in-Charge, H.M. Coastguard, Eastney.
- Evelyn, Mrs. Appleyard, Foster Mother, North Yorkshire Social Services Department.
- William Frederick Arthur Archer, Postman and for services to the community in Suffolk.
- Harry Melville Baker, lately Bosun-in-Command, Royal Maritime Auxiliary Service, H.M. Naval Base-Portland
- George Reginald Bancroft, Conductor, London Midland Region, British Railways.
- David Ian Banwell. For services to fostering and adoption in Wales.
- Irene Ann, Mrs. Banwell. For services to fostering and adoption in Wales.
- Miss Kathleen Nora Barker, lately Secretary to chairman and chief executive officer, European Gas Turbine Company.
- Martin Gerald Barret, Foreman Painter and Rigger, Avon County Council.
- Ruby Lilian, Mrs. Barton, Local Officer II, Department of Social Security.
- Sheila Jean, Mrs. Barton. For services to the community in Rye, East Sussex.
- Pamela Kathleen, Mrs. Barwell, lately Secretary to Director-General, The Chamber of Shipping (formerly The General Council of British Shipping).
- Mabel Eileen, Mrs. Bateman. For services to the Northampton Women's Royal Voluntary Service.
- Desmond Norie Bathgate, Sergeant, Lothian and Borders Police.
- Vera May, Mrs. Beard, Local Officer II, Department of Social Security.
- John Bell, Chauffeur to the Bishop of Newcastle.
- Peter Joseph Bermingham. For services to the Tunnel Construction Industry.
- Edward Anthony Berry. For services to the community in Bradford, West Yorkshire.
- William George Best. For services to the community in Owermoigne, Dorset.
- Eddie Reginald Bird, lately Superintendent of Works, Warwickshire County Council.
- Edward George Blacklaw, Pipeshop Superintendent, Yarrow Shipbuilders Ltd.
- Clifford Bond, British Embassy, Washington.
- John Samuel Boreham, Support Grade Band 1, H.M. Treasury.
- Martin Peter Borlase, Head Gardener, Lanhydrock, Cornwall, The National Trust.
- Keith Bown, Sergeant, South Yorkshire Police.
- Miss Rosemary Joy Boxall, Administration Supervisor, Surrey Constabulary.
- Anne Elizabeth Margaret, Mrs. Boyd. For services to the community in Oban.
- Douglas Arthur Brayne, lately Head Janitor, Telford Development Corporation.
- Robert Johnman Breingan, lately Janitor, Strathdevon Primary School, Dollar.
- Dorothy Lilian Shirley, Mrs. Brett, Administrative Assistant, Ministry of Defence.
- Clive Kingdon Brooking, Verger, Britannia Royal Naval College.
- Mary Bridie, Mrs. Brough, Head of Cadlington House, Hampshire, Royal Society for Mentally Handicapped Children and Adults.
- Raymond Sydney Brown, Manager, Design Office Administration, Marconi Radar Systems Ltd.
- George Ritchie Campbell. For services to the Roslin and Bilston Community Council.
- James Carlisle, Superintendent of Library Buildings, South Eastern Education and Library Board, Northern Ireland.
- Martha Villiers-Dobbie, Mrs. Carwood, Convener, Calton Old People's Club, Glasgow.
- David Cawley, Caretaker, Colyton Grammar School, Devon.
- Derek Harold Chandler. For services to live entertainment for disabled people.
- Evelyn Dorothy, Mrs. Chandler. For services to live entertainment for disabled people.
- Leslie John Cheeseman. For services to Cricket Umpiring.
- Robert McLeish Christie. For services to the Blood Transfusion Service, Edinburgh.
- James Frederick Clark, Sergeant, Ministry of Defence Police.
- Mary Jane Bell (Jean), Mrs. Clark. For services to the community in Corby, Northamptonshire.
- Joan Mary, Mrs. Clatworthy, Cleaner-in-Charge, Ely Health Centre, Cardiff.
- Alec Clayton, Catering Manager, Navy, Army and Air Force Institute.
- Miss Dorothy Jean Clements. For services to the community in Hastings, East Sussex.
- Pearl Adelina Jean, Mrs. Clough, Typist, Board of Customs and Excise.
- Miss Margaret Mary Susan Coleborn, Clerical Assistant, London Electricity plc.
- Miss Margaret Angela Coleman, Detective Constable, Royal Ulster Constabulary.
- Dawn Emma Alice, Mrs. Collins. For catering services to the Mitcham and Morden Unit, Sea Cadet Corps.
- John Robert Cook, Skilled Armature Winder, Rotary Electrical Company Ltd.
- Roberta Isabella, Mrs. Cook. For services to the Lancaster Women's Royal Voluntary Service.
- Anthony Cooper, Constable, Metropolitan Police.
- Peter Kevin Cooper, Motorway Maintenance Supervisor, Frank Graham, Consulting Engineers.
- Thomas John London Copland, lately Senior Library Assistant, National Library of Scotland, Scottish Office.
- Miss Mary Phyllis Coppack, Revenue Assistant, Board of Inland Revenue.
- Terence Winston Coupland, Road Tanker Driver, Fina plc.
- Archibald Jonah Covey, School Crossing Patrol, Bognor Regis.
- Mervyn Nathaniel Creighton, Head Observer, Royal Observer Corps.
- Miss Corinne Kathleen Creswell, Personal Secretary, Hampshire Probation Service.
- Arthur Laurence Vivian Curnow, lately Coxswain, Torbay Lifeboat, Royal National Lifeboat Institution.
- David Walter Daniel. For services to the Council for Education in the Commonwealth.
- John William Tough Davidson, Support Grade Band 2 (Laboratory Attendant), Scottish Office.
- Clifford Llewellyn Davies, Head Porter, Withybush General Hospital, Dyfed.
- Menna, Mrs. Davies, Factory Accountant, Remploy and for services to the community in Dinefwr, Wales.
- Catherine Maureen, Mrs. De Courcey, Administrative Officer, Ministry of Defence.
- Shirley Elizabeth, Mrs. Denley, Clerical Assistant, South Wales Electricity plc.
- Brian Dobson, Constable, Greater Manchester Police.
- Richard Riddington Dolphin. For services to the community in Taunton, Somerset.
- John Donaldson, Master Roof Tiler, Marley Roof Tiles Ltd.
- David Dougal, chairman, Eyemouth Harbour Trust.
- Melvin Stanbury Douglas. For services to the community in Derbyshire.
- Clive Dove, Senior Foreman, Pilatus Britten-Norman Ltd.
- Daniel Draper. For services to the Royal British Legion in Lancashire.
- Hugh Drysdale, Drystone Walling Contractor.
- Francis George Duffett. For services to Boxing.
- Gordon Ernest Dunkley. For services to Thatching.
- Helen Mavis, Mrs. Dunn, Nursing Auxiliary, Wells Cottage Hospital, Norwich Health Authority.
- Leslie Dutton, lately Chargehand and Carpenter, British Waterways Board.
- Gerald Walter Eason, Pest Control Officer, South Norfolk District Council and for services to the community in South Norfolk
- Miss Janette Louise Eccles. For services to The National Trust in Northern Ireland.
- Richard James Edwards, Foundry Engineer, Marconi Defence Systems Ltd.
- Miss Jacquelyn Gwen Suzanne Eite. For services to the Birmingham Schools Play Centres.
- Francis Paul Ellingham, Plaster Technician, South Mead Hospital, Bristol.
- Frederick George Elliott, Veterinary Industrial Brander, Department of Agriculture, Northern Ireland Office.
- Harold Claud Evernden, Vice President, Fire Services National Benevolent Fund.
- Miss Janet Proctor Eyers, Secretary to Chief Executive, Midlothian District Council.
- Miss Ann Millicent Faulkner. For services to the Northamptonshire Branch, British Red Cross Society.
- Joan Margaret, Mrs. Fillingham, Voluntary Museum Curator, Lincolnshire Police.
- Kenneth Floyd, lately Prison Auxiliary, Prison Service Headquarters.
- Kenneth Allen Footman, Senior Retail Manager, Kirby and West Ltd.
- Doris May, Mrs. Ford, Support Grade Band 1 (Senior Messenger), Department of Trade and Industry.
- Thomas Hugh Forrest, Production Fitter, British Aerospace (Military Aircraft) Ltd.
- Christopher John Fox, lately Steward, Lambeth Palace.
- Kenneth Oswald Franklyn, Head Porter, Marine Highland Hotel.
- Wilson Freeburn. For services to youth and community projects in Lurgan, Co. Armagh.
- Royston Francis Fry, Ganger and Chargehand, Severn Trent Region, National Rivers Authority.
- Hannah, Mrs. Gadishaw, lately Typist, Department of Education and Science.
- Albert Frew Gainford, lately Administrator, Forces Help Society and Lord Roberts Workshops and for services to the ex-Service community.
- Miss Pamela Garrett Gale, Personal Assistant to Director, Appeals Department, Cancer Research Campaign, London.
- Thomas Grant Gay, Craftsman, Daw Mill Colliery, British Coal.
- Winifred, Mrs. Gettings, lately Support Grade Band 2 (Usher), Lord Chancellor's Department.
- Maurice Edward Gill, Chauffeur, A Monk Construction Ltd.
- Mary Blythe, Mrs. Goddard. For services to the community in Honiton, Devon.
- Robert Gore, Distribution Fitter, Northern Ireland Electricity.
- Ruth, Mrs. Gore, lately Support Grade Band 2, Board of Customs and Excise.
- Grace Ellen, Mrs. Graves, lately Support Grade Band 2 (Cleaner), Board of Customs and Excise.
- Reginald Cyril Greatorex. For services to the Derby and District Battalion, The Boys Brigade.
- William Douglas Gregory. For services to the community in Leek, Staffordshire.
- Joan Iris, Mrs. Gudgin, Administrative Officer, Department of Trade and Industry.
- Ann, Mrs. Haikney, Personal Secretary, Department of the Environment.
- Cecil Tyrrell Hancock, Auxiliary Coastguard-in-Charge, H.M. Coastguard Ilfracombe.
- Anthony Hanlon, Fireman, London Fire Brigade.
- Robert Walter Harris, Grounds Superintendent, Royal National Orthopaedic Hospital, Stanmore.
- George Charles Hawkins, Senior Storekeeper, Ministry of Defence.
- Frank George Hill. For services to the Southgate and Wood Green Branch, Royal Air Forces Association.
- Trevor Edward Hill, Foreman, Berkeley Nuclear Laboratories, Nuclear Electric plc.
- Derek Horton-Rackstraw, PSG3, Hazardous Materials Service, U.K. Atomic Energy Authority.
- Geoffrey Howard, Senior Planning Engineer, Ferranti International plc.
- Elizabeth Mary Dora, Mrs. Howells, Administrative Officer, Ministry of Defence.
- Eric Nicholas Richard Hubber, Able Seaman, Royal Maritime Auxiliary Service, H.M. Naval Base Devonport.
- Haydn Hughes, Hospital Theatre Porter, Wrexham Maelor Hospital, Clwyd.
- Ivan Ernest Hulme, Senior Production Engineer, British Aerospace (Military Aircraft) Ltd.
- Robert William Huson, Senior Supervisor, Remploy.
- William Hutchinson, lately Senior Technician, The Manchester Museum.
- Hedley George Hyde. For services to the Godalming Group, The Ramblers Association.
- John Robert Inkster, lately Auto Loader, NEI Reyrolle Ltd.
- Donald Miller Thomson Inrig, Clerk of Works, Dounreay United Kingdom Atomic Energy Authority.
- Joseph William James, Observer, No. 10 Group, Exeter Royal Observer Corps.
- Gladys, Mrs. Johnson, Housekeeper, St. Martin's College, Lancaster.
- Sheila, Mrs. Johnston, Support Grade Band 1 (Telephonist), Department of Social Security.
- James Russell Johnstone, National Secretary, Scottish Juvenile Football Association.
- John Walker Jolly, Sub Officer Retained, Grampian Fire Brigade.
- Donald Jones, Constable, West Midlands Police.
- Marion, Mrs. Jones. For services to the Kent Branch, British Red Cross Society.
- Miss Rosemary Maureen Jordan. For services to the community in Wellington, Somerset.
- Brian Keegan, Storekeeper and District Secretary, Halifax and District Branch, Wireworkers Union, Smith Wire Ltd.
- Margaret Alice, Mrs. Keens, lately Clerk, Bramshott and Liphook Parish Council.
- Denis Robert Keirle, First Aid Organiser, London Transport Medical Service and for services to the St. John Ambulance Association.
- Edward John King, Fireman, Aeroplane and Armament Experimental Establishment, Ministry of Defence.
- John Harry Knight, Asset Section Head, National Grid Company.
- Jean Kathryn, Mrs. Law, Secretary, Nottinghamshire Branch, Soldiers', Sailors' and Airmen's Families Association.
- Miriam Helena, Mrs. Lee, Revenue Assistant, Board of Inland Revenue.
- Herbert Horace Legg, Storekeeping Assistant Band 6, Ministry of Defence.
- John James Leishman, Chief Petty Officer and Instructor, Methil Unit, Sea Cadet Corps.
- Eric Lewis, Chief Steward, Intercity, British Railways.
- Eric George Lewis, Administrative Officer, Ministry of Defence.
- Miss Ann May Bell Lilly. For services to animal welfare.
- Rex Line, Chargehand (Instrument Fitter), Defence Research Agency, Ministry of Defence.
- Edgar Frederick Norman Lloyd. For services to Association Football in Walsall.
- Arthur James Locke. For services to The Sussex Racial Equality Council.
- David John MacGregor, Foreign and Commonwealth Office.
- Miss Ishbel Macleod Mackechnie, Constable, Metropolitan Police.
- Robert Nolan Maiden, lately Coxswain, Hartlepool Lifeboat, Royal National Lifeboat Institution.
- Jean Isabel, Mrs. Marsh, Typist, Department of Employment.
- Baron Frederick Martin, Roadway Re-ripper, Silverdale Colliery, British Coal.
- Maria De La Concepcion, Mrs. Martinez, Housekeeper, National Gallery, Office of Arts and Libraries.
- Gordon Philip Henry Matthews, Charting Officer, Trinity House.
- Graham Eric May, Constable, Staffordshire Police.
- Raymond May, Sub-Divisional Officer, Greater Manchester Special Constabulary.
- Patricia Anne, Mrs. McBride, Principal, Segal House, Belfast, Royal Society for Mentally Handicapped Children and Adults.
- Michael John McDonagh, Colliery Overman, Kiveton Colliery, British Coal.
- Thomas McDonald, Plater, Yarrow Shipbuilders Ltd.
- Edward McEvoy, Senior Draughtsman, GEC Alsthom Traction Ltd.
- Robert John McFarland, Postman, Fintona Sub Post Office, The Post Office and for services to the Royal British Legion.
- James Thomas Lamond McMahon, Plumber, Livingston Development Corporation.
- George Scott McMillan, lately Principal Officer, H.M. Prison, Barlinnie.
- Theresa, Mrs. McQuillan, Telephone Supervisor, Glasgow Polytechnic.
- David McSweeney, Police Constable, West Yorkshire Police.
- James Joseph Mee, Motor Driver, London Midland Region, British Railways.
- James Matthew Michie, Farm Manager and Shepherd, Drumardoch Fanning Company.
- John Mitchell, chairman, Whitehills Harbour Commission.
- Miss Patricia Margaret Mobsby, Personal Secretary, Council of Territorial Auxiliary and Volunteer Reserve Associations.
- Gordon George Moore, lately Parish Clerk, Queen Camel Parish Council, Yeovil, Somerset.
- Partricia Florence, Mrs. Moran, Centre Organiser, Surrey Branch, British Red Cross Society.
- James Henry Mumby. For services to the St. John Ambulance Brigade and to Sport.
- Ram Nath, British High Commission, New Delhi.
- Frederick Newell, Engineering Plant Operator, Property Service Agency Services, Department of the Environment.
- Ronald Thomas Newman, C5A Clerk, Royal Electrical and Mechanical Engineers, British Army of the Rhine.
- Alexander Thompson Nicholl, Reserve Constable, Royal Ulster Constabulary.
- Maurice Nimmo, Volunteer Observer, Meteorological Office.
- Charles John Mackay O'Brien, Pipe Major and for services to the teaching of Piping.
- Raymond Officer, Constable, Royal Ulster Constabulary.
- Hugh Robert Orr, Fish Grader, Northern Ireland Fish Producers Organisation.
- Harty Georgina, Mrs. Osborne. For services to the Bath Hospital Broadcasts Society.
- Olivia Shemurta Mrs. Osborne, Co-ordinator, Bristol Community Growth and Support Association.
- Bernard Albert Owen, Fireman and Convenor, General Municipal Boilermakers and Allied Trades Union, British Nuclear Fuels.
- Edna, Mrs. Page. For services to the Worthing Hospital, League of Remembrance.
- John Ernest Parker, Chief Instructor and Master Boatbuilder, International Boatbuilding Training Centre.
- Paddy, Mrs. Parsons. For services to the Sunfield Children's Homes, West Midlands
- William Stanley Parsons. For services to the community in Horsham, West Sussex.
- George Paterson, Senior Production Engineer, GEC Ferranti.
- Ronald Keith Payton, Executive Member, Industrial Fire Protection Association.
- Doris May, Mrs. Pearman. For services to the Immingham Women's Royal Voluntary Service.
- Kathleen Mary, Mrs. Phillips. For services to the Cancer Scanner Appeal Fund, Addenbrooke's Hospital.
- Susan Morag, Mrs. Pike. For services to animal welfare in Norton Lindsey, Warwickshire.
- Sheila, Mrs. Pirie, Typist, Ministry of Defence.
- Roy Platts, Principal Officer, H.M. Prison, Parkhurst.
- Thomas Owen Powell. For services to the local community in Caerwys, Mold.
- Ivy Henrietta, Mrs. Pragnell, Personal Secretary, National Farmers Union.
- Christine Hilary, Mrs. Prichard. For services to the Warwickshire Branch, British Red Cross Society.
- Dorothy Joan, Mrs. Pryce. For services to Lawn Tennis.
- Thomas George Reilly, Officer Instructor, Northern Ireland Prison Service.
- John Rendall, Key Keeper, Holm of Papa and Knap of Howar, Orkney, Scottish Office.
- David John Rennels, Sub Officer Retained, Gwent Fire Brigade.
- Henry Thomas Reynolds, lately Museum Technician II, Royal Air Force Museum, Hendon, Ministry of Defence.
- Karen, Mrs. Rice, Constable, Dumfries and Galloway Constabulary.
- Watkin Richards, Sub Officer Retained, Clwyd Fire Brigade.
- Henry James Ricketts. For services to the community in Bodmin.
- Miss Annie Millicent Roderick, Treasurer, Disabled Drivers Association, Dyfed.
- Reginald Rothery, Senior Storekeeper, Ministry of Defence.
- Jean Mrs. Rowe, Administrative Officer, Ministry of Agriculture, Fisheries and Food.
- Jean Marjorie, Mrs. Rowe. For services to the Kingston Women's Royal Voluntary Service.
- Charles Guy Rowell. For services to voluntary organisations and to the community in Oxfordshire.
- Evelyne, Mrs. Rowles, Senior Operations Assistant, BP Oil UK Ltd.
- James Ryan, Foreman and Co-ordinator of Projects, Chapman Ryan Ltd.
- Margaret, Mrs. Salt, Postwoman, Birmingham, The Post Office and for charitable services to the community in Birmingham.
- Ian Savage, Assistant Manager, Sheffield Training Centre, Engineering Industry Training Board.
- Gladys Mary, Mrs. Sayers, Typist, Royal Military Police.
- Myra, Mrs. Scott, Head of Library Services, Short Brothers plc.
- Daphne Jean, Mrs. Shakespeare, Foster Parent, Essex Social Services Department.
- Jean Gardiner, Mrs. Shimmons, Personal Assistant, South-Eastern Education and Library Board, Northern Ireland.
- Nellie Alice, Mrs. Sims. For services to the community in Romford, Essex.
- Peter Singer, Leavers Lace Twisthand, F and C Mason Ltd.
- Mary, Mrs. Skelham, Sub-postmistress, Market Harborough, Leicestershire and for services to the community in Market Harborough.
- Betty, Mrs. Slade. For services to the 6th High Wycombe Cub Pack.
- Nora Ford, Mrs. Smith. For services to the community in Craigmillar, Edinburgh.
- Roger John Harvey Smith. For services to the Rainbow Club, Gloucester.
- William Alfred Smith, Face Worker, Cotgrave Colliery, British Coal.
- Wilfrid Joseph Snell, Warehouseman, Sterling Wharfage Company Ltd.
- Jeremy Sorenson. For services to the Royal Society for the Protection of Birds.
- Michael Adair Stagey, lately Senior Ranger, Ministry of Agriculture, Fisheries and Food (Forestry Commission).
- Alfred Watt Stewart, lately Depot Foreman, London Underground Ltd.
- Lewis Bernard Story, Probation Volunteer, Berkshire Probation Service.
- Michael Embleton Stothard, Fireman, London Fire Brigade.
- Basil Howard Stratton, Head Tractor Driver and Mechanic, Ministry of Agriculture, Fisheries and Food.
- Walter Stubbs, Stores Officer Grade 'C', Home Office.
- Ian Reginald Surface, Auxiliary Coastguard-in-Charge, H.M. Coastguard, Swanage.
- William Arthur Taggart. For services to the Timber Industry in Northern Ireland.
- Alan Robert Taylor, Porter and Cleaner, King Alfred's College, Winchester.
- Miss Mary Polly Taylor. For voluntary services to the community in Belfast.
- Miss Beatrice Margaret Teasdale, Personal Assistant, Cumbria Constabulary.
- William Tease, Sergeant, Royal Ulster Constabulary.
- Geoffrey Thom, Assistant Resident Engineer, Rolls-Royce and Associates Ltd.
- Constance Irene, Mrs. Thomas. For voluntary services in Bridgnorth, Shropshire.
- Sarah Agnes Violet, Mrs. Thompson. For services to the community in Dungannon, Co. Tyrone.
- Douglas Miller Thomson, Police Constable, Derbyshire Constabulary.
- Gordon Derek Thorpe, Wharf Boatswain, Harwich Depot, Trinity House.
- Gerald William Tincknell, lately Secretary, British Transport Police Force Federation, British Railways.
- Shiu Wing To, Administration Assistant, Ministry of Defence.
- Maureen, Mrs. Todd. For services to the Sea Cadet Corps.
- William Toryusen, Manager, Bemrose Security and Promotional Printing, Bemrose Group plc.
- Miss Pamela Winifred Townsend. For services to the Willow Tree Animal Sanctuary, Halstead, Essex.
- Miss Joan Isobel Tozer, Typist, Metropolitan Police.
- Eva Alice Lucy, Mrs. Tucker. For services to the Bridge Hospital, Essex, League of Friends.
- Richard James Turpin, Custody Guard, Department of the Environment.
- William Ross Twizell, Shepherd.
- Miss Kathleen Vaughan, Secretary, Llanidloes Hospital, Powys.
- George Albert Vaux, Painter and Decorator, Independent Television Commission.
- John Brian Vessey, Machine Foreman, British Steel plc.
- Barry Voce, Stores Officer, Royal Ordnance plc.
- Robert Walker, Professional and Head Greenkeeper, Cairndhu Golf Club, Lame.
- James Stephen Waters, Senior Water Resources Officer, National Rivers Authority.
- Peter Stanley Weaver, Clerk, Nailsea Town Council.
- Miss Grace Webb, Secretary, West Devon Area Education Office.
- William Joseph Logan Ross Wield, General Worker 4, British Nuclear Fuels plc.
- Eva May, Mrs. Wheatley, School Crossing Patrol, East Sussex County Council.
- Gilbert Albert Whiffin, Sub Officer Retained, Cambridgeshire Fire Brigade.
- Ernest Edward Whitcombe. For services to Golf.
- Merle, Mrs. White, Administrative Officer, Department of Social Security.
- Peter Aubrey White, Technician, Transport and Road Research Laboratory, Department of Transport.
- Margaret Elizabeth, Mrs. Whitehead. For services to the community in Northwich, Cheshire.
- Mary Margaret, Mrs. Whitfield. For services to the Old Town Community, Edinburgh.
- Miss Tegwen Anne Wilkins, Clerk and Shorthand Typist, South Wales Constabulary.
- Rosina Winifred, Mrs. Williamson, Support Grade Band I (Senior Messenger), Department of Transport.
- Gordon Cyril Wilson, lately Sewage Operative, Anglian Water plc.
- James Wilson. For services to the community in Kirkcudbrightshire.
- Joan, Mrs. Wilson. For services to the Wetherby Women's Royal Voluntary Service.
- Roy Arthur Edward Wiltshire, Sub Officer Retained, Wiltshire Fire Brigade.
- John Andrew Winchester, Sector Officer, Sullom Voe, H.M. Coastguard, Shetland, Department of Transport.
- June, Mrs. Winstanley, Revenue Typist, Board of Inland Revenue.
- Marion Jane McKeand, Mrs. Wishart. For services to the community in Dumfries.
- Rodney Colin James Witt, Chief Clerk, Rugby Cement.
- Betty, Mrs. Wood, Personal Secretary, Department of Education and Science.
- Miss Alison Joyce Wooldridge. For services to the community in West Wratting, Cambridge.
- Frederick John Wrigglesworth, Revenue Assistant, Board of Inland Revenue.
- Miss Doris Hilda Chapman Zobel. For charitable services in Sevenoaks, Kent.

Overseas Territories

- Mary, Mrs. Bagrie, Senior Confidential Assistant, Constitutional Affairs Branch, Hong Kong.
- Charles Catania. For public and community services in Gibraltar.
- Cheng Kam-po, Artisan 1, Hospital Services Department, Hong Kong.
- Maureen Margaret, Mrs. Dickinson, Senior Personal Secretary, Secretary for the Civil Service, Hong Kong.
- Charles Flower. For services to Sport in Gibraltar.
- Fok Siu-pong, Superintendent, Accounts and Finance Division, Post Office Headquarters, Hong Kong.
- Nicholas Lau Chun-kong, Nursing Officer, Hospital Services Department, Hong Kong.
- George Franklin Manderson, Senior Superintendent, Public Works Department, Cayman Islands.
- Miss Gladys March, Senior Personal Secretary, Finance Branch, Hong Kong.
- Poon Kwok-chu, Senior Technical Officer (Civil), Transport Department, Hong Kong.
- Samuel Richardson, 1st Assistant Keeper, Sombrero Lighthouse, Anguilla.

=== Royal Red Cross ===
Royal Red Cross (RRC)

- Major Kathleen Bland, Queen Alexandra's Royal Army Nursing Corps.
- Lieutenant Colonel Lynda Anne Parker, Queen Alexandra's Royal Army Nursing Corps, Territorial Army.
- Squadron Leader Lesley Chew, Princess Mary's Royal Air Force Nursing Service.

Associates of the Royal Red Cross (ARRC)

- Chief Petty Officer Enrolled Nurse (General) Stella Devadason, Queen Alexandra's Royal Naval Nursing Service.
- Superintending Nursing Officer Margaret Jane Sutton RD, Queen Alexandra's Royal Naval Nursing Service (Reserves).
- Sergeant Alison Hildegarde Patricia Murdy, Queen Alexandra's Royal Army Nursing Corps.
- Sergeant Christopher Stephen Nicholson, Royal Army Medical Corps
- Captain Ena Mary Walton, Queen Alexandra's Royal Army Nursing Corps.
- Sergeant Anthony Paul Hopkins, Royal Air Force.

=== Air Force Cross (AFC) ===
- Captain James Stephen Lawton, Army Air Corps.
- Warrant Officer Class 1 Michael John Sharp, Army Air Corps, MID

Territorial Army

- Wing Commander Arthur William Cope, MBE, Royal Air Force.
- Wing Commander (now Group Captain) Alan Threadgould, Royal Air Force.

=== Queen's Police Medal (QPM) ===
England and Wales

- Terence Babbidge, Chief Inspector, Metropolitan Police.
- Peter Stafford Brock, Detective Superintendent, Avon and Somerset Constabulary.
- John Arthur Coo, Commander, Metropolitan Police.
- James Frederick Darley, Constable, Cleveland Constabulary.
- Robert Alan Hunt, Assistant Commissioner, Metropolitan Police.
- Gordon Montague Jones, Deputy Chief Constable, Staffordshire Police.
- Peter John Lewis, Deputy Assistant Commissioner, Metropolitan Police.
- Kenneth Mackay, Chief Superintendent, Lancashire Constabulary.
- Hugh John Moore, Commander, City of London Police.
- David William Olson, Detective Chief Superintendent, Merseyside Police.
- John Thomas Rose, Detective Chief Superintendent, Humberside Police.
- David Reginald Walter Scott, lately Assistant Chief Constable, Sussex Police.
- Martyn Herbert Sherwood, Chief Superintendent, North Yorkshire Police.
- John Arthur Stevens, Chief Constable, Northumbria Police.
- Miss Gwendoline Anne Symonds, Chief Superintendent, Metropolitan Police.
- David John Williams, Chief Constable, Surrey Constabulary.
- Joseph Barker Wilson, Constable, West Yorkshire Police.

Channel Islands

- David Parkinson, Chief Officer, States of Jersey Police.

Northern Ireland

- Samuel John Beattie, Constable, Royal Ulster Constabulary; chairman, Police Federation for Northern Ireland.
- Albert Neil Falkingham, Chief Inspector, Royal Ulster Constabulary.
- Michael McAtamney, CBE, Deputy Chief Constable, Royal Ulster Constabulary.

Bermuda

- Lennett Maurice Edwards, CPM, Deputy Commissioner of Police, Bermuda.

Hong Kong

- Dennis John Collins, CPM, Chief Superintendent, Royal Hong Kong Police Force.
- James Kenneth Ewan, CPM, Chief Superintendent, Royal Hong Kong Police Force.

Scotland

- Henry Woods Bell, Detective Chief Inspector, Strathclyde Police.
- Hugh Paton, Assistant Chief Constable, Strathclyde Police..
- Andrew Sutherland McKay, Constable, Tayside Police.

=== Queen's Fire Service Medal (QFSM) ===
England and Wales

- Eric Lloyd Clark, Acting Deputy Chief Officer, North Yorkshire Fire and Rescue Service.
- Miles William Cotterall, Senior Divisional Officer, Merseyside Fire Brigade.
- Kenneth John Lloyd, Chief Officer, West Sussex Fire Brigade.
- Peter Alan George Morphew, Chief Officer, East Sussex Fire Brigade.
- Graham Edward Morris, Assistant Divisional Officer, Shropshire Fire Service.
- Alan Victor Rule, Chief Officer, Cumbria Fire Service

Hong Kong

- Peter Cheung, CPM, Chief Officer, Hong Kong Fire Services.
- Raymond Brian Johnston, CPM, lately Chief Officer, Hong Kong Fire Services.

=== Colonial Police and Fire Service Medal (CPM) ===
- Ernest Bailey, Superintendent, Royal Hong Kong Police Force.
- Chan Chi-hing, Station Sergeant, Royal Hong Kong Police Force.
- Chan Fu, Senior Inspector, Royal Hong Kong Police Force.
- Choi King-sang, Senior Divisional Officer, Hong Kong Fire Services.
- Peter Heywood Cummings, Superintendent, Royal Hong Kong Police Force.
- Spencer Foo Tsun-kong, Senior Superintendent, Royal Hong Kong Police Force.
- Michael William Horner, Senior Superintendent, Royal Hong Kong Police Force.
- Lau Man-kwong, Station Sergeant, Royal Hong Kong Police Force.
- Joseph Law, Senior Divisional Officer, Hong Kong Fire Service.
- Loo Wing-lam, Senior Divisional Officer, Hong Kong Fire Services.
- David Gordon Ronald, Superintendent, Royal Hong Kong Police Force.
- Paul Eustace Smith, Superintendent, Royal Hong Kong Police Force.
- Tsung Pui-yu, Chief Inspector, Royal Hong Kong Police Force.
- Wong Fuk-kuen, Station Sergeant, Royal Hong Kong Police Force.
- Wong Ying-chung, Superintendent (Auxiliary), Royal Hong Kong Police Force.
- William Richard Worrall, Senior Superintendent, Royal Hong Kong Police Force.

=== Queen's Commendation for Valuable Service in the Air (QCVSA) ===
Military Division

Royal Navy

- Lieutenant Commander Neil Martin Hughes
- Lieutenant Commander Peter David Kenward

Royal Air Force

- Flight Lieutenant Terence Patrick Michael Cairns
- Squadron Leader Thomas Patrick Conlon
- Squadron Leader Alfred Brian Fuller
- Squadron Leader Martin Lawrence Lampitt
- Squadron Leader Anthony Kenneth Lunnon-Wood
- Squadron Leader Richard Alastair Phillips
- Flight Lieutenant Alan Charles Bjorn Singer
- Squadron Leader Stuart David Vince

Civil Division

- Alastair Stuart Atchison, First Officer, British Airways.
- Susan, Mrs. Gibbins, Stewardess, British Airways.

== Cook Islands ==
=== Order of the British Empire ===
==== Commander of the Order of the British Empire (CBE) ====
Civil Division

- The Honourable Inatio Akaruru – Deputy Prime Minister of the Cook Islands.

==== Officer of the Order of the British Empire (OBE) ====
Civil Division

- Neil Pearson McKegg – chairman, Cook Island Trading Company.

=== British Empire Medal (BEM) ===
Civil Division

- Kapua Ariki Ioteva (Joseph). For services to the community.

== Mauritius ==
=== Knight Bachelor ===
- Bhinod Bacha, CMG, For public service.
- Francois Henri Yoo Foo. For services to development and housing.

=== The Most Distinguished Order of Saint Michael and Saint George ===
==== Companion of the Order of St Michael and St George (CMG) ====
- Jean Lois Le Vieux. For services to land surveying.

=== The Most Excellent Order of the British Empire ===
==== Commander of the Order of the British Empire (CBE) ====
- Paul de Chasteigner Du Mee. For services to industry.
- Joseph George Harold Glover. For services to industrial relations.
- Deonarain Madhub. For services to local government.

==== Officer of the Order of the British Empire (OBE) ====
- Sulleman Mamode Atchia. For services to cinematography.
- Louis Joseph Gerard Hebrard. For public service.
- Gerard Jean Claude Hoareau. For services to the sugar industry.
- Louis Marie Gerard Francis Maurel. For services to the construction industry.
- Jugmohun Phoolchund. For public service.
- Louis Serge Seenyen. For services to industry.
- Andrew Kenneth Slome. For services to tourism.
- Sandragassen Soobrayen. For services to nursing.

==== Member of the Order of the British Empire (MBE) ====
- Inderjeet Badal. For services to the community.
- Premlall Dabydoyal. For services to the cooperative movement.
- Shree Ramloo Juganaidoo. For services to the community.
- Louis Serge Kisnorbo. For services to the community.
- Elizabeth, Mrs. Leveque. For services to family planning.
- Virjanan Mulloo. For services to the community.
- Dumodur Naeck. For public service.
- Kooldeo Nathoo. For services to nursing.
- Marie Chantal Josiane, Mrs. Nicolin. For public service.
- Ramess Ramburn. For services to the community.
- Mungulpersand Teeluckdharry. For services to the community.
- Mamode Ahmode Timol. For services to the community.

=== Imperial Service Order (ISO) ===
- Guy Christian Hope, Lately Assistant Commissioner of Prisons.

=== Queen's Police Medal (QPM) ===
- Louis Regis Barbeau, Assistant Commissioner of Police.
- Goorooduth Buramdoyal, Deputy Commissioner of Police.

=== Mauritius Police Medal (MPM) ===
- Premduth Gooljar, Director-General National Intelligence Unit.
- Marie Claire Lourdes Leong Son, Police Woman Chief Inspector.
- Andre Irenee Lucchesi, Police Constable.
- Manicon Soopaya, Superintendent of Police.

== Bahamas ==
=== The Most Excellent Order of the British Empire ===
==== Commander of the Order of the British Empire (CBE) ====
- Edwin Leroy Coleby. For public service.
- Livingston Basil Johnson. For public service.

==== Officer of the Order of the British Empire (OBE) ====
- Gurth Walter Elton Archer. For public service.
- Stephen Spurgeon Bethel. For services to the community.

==== Member of the Order of the British Empire (MBE) ====
- John Reul Marshhall, JP, For services to the community.
- Keith Verde Mason, Deputy Commissioner of Police.
- Isadora, Mrs. Maynard. For services to the community.
- Richard Herbert Roberts. For services to commerce.

=== British Empire Medal (BEM) ===
- Herbert Deveaux. For services to the community.

== Grenada ==
=== Knight Bachelor ===
- Meredith Alister Mcintyre. For public service.

=== The Most Excellent Order of the British Empire ===
==== Officer of the Order of the British Empire (OBE) ====
- Emmanuel Uriah Buckmire. For services to the community.

==== Member of the Order of the British Empire (MBE) ====
- Miss Ruby Compton. For services to education.
- Miss Dorothy Hopkin. For services to the community

=== British Empire Medal (BEM) ===
- David Raymond Isaac Alexander. For public service.
- James Antoine. For services to industry.
- Canute Calliste. For services to the community.
- Ernest Gregory Gibbs. For public service.

== Papua New Guinea ==
=== Knights Bachelor ===
- Daniel Joseph Leahy, Junior, For services to the community.
- Harry Friedrich Pelgen, MBE, For services to the community.
- Timothy Pohai, MBE, For services to the community.

=== The Most Distinguished Order of Saint Michael and Saint George ===
==== Companion of the Order of St Michael and St George (CMG) ====
- The Honourable Jack Genia, MP, For public service.
- The Honourable Utula Samana, MP, For public service.

=== The Most Excellent Order of the British Empire ===
==== Knight Commander of the Order of the British Empire (KBE) ====
- Frederick Bernard Carl Reiher, CMG, For public service.

==== Commander of the Order of the British Empire (CBE) ====
- Leith Reinsford Steven Anderson, MBE, For public service.
- The Honourable Sepoe Karava, M.P.A. For political services.
- Frank Kramer. For public service.
- Christopher Sambre, MP, For political services.
- Henry Tokam, QPM, For public service.

==== Officer of the Order of the British Empire (OBE) ====
Civil Division

- Stanis John Bubu Bai. For services to banking.
- The Honourable Sinai Brown, M.P.A. For public service.
- Georkios Constantinou. For services to the community.
- John Norbert Dawanincura. For services to sport.
- Peter Mero Eka. For public service.
- Maria, Mrs. Kopkop. For services to women's affairs.
- Vili Maha. For services to sport.
- Leo Morgan. For public service.
- Robert Nenta, QPM, Deputy Police Commissioner.
- The Honourable Thomas Pais, MP, For political services.
- ToDokta Taule. For services to the community.
- Jeffrey Charles Wall. For public service.
- The Honourable William Wii, MP, For political services.

Military Division

- Colonel Paul Peter Tovlon Baitman. For service to the Papua New Guinea Defence Force.

==== Member of the Order of the British Empire (MBE) ====
Civil Division

- Rowland Abaijah. For services to civil aviation.
- James Baker. For public service.
- Chief Inspector Gari Baki. For services to the Royal Papua New Guinea Constabulary.
- Miss Joan Bampton. For services to sport.
- Nagora Bogan. For public service.
- Remmert Hermanus Paulus Buitendam. For public service.
- Joseph Chan. For services to the community.
- Linley Ralph Foster. For public service.
- Lothar Erich Grahl. For services to the community.
- Willie Hambogosi. For services to local government.
- John Harangu. For services to sport and public service.
- Vimru Iagata. For public service.
- Reuben Kaiulo. For public service.
- Henry Lewis. For services to the community!
- Ludwig Mota. For services to local government.
- Gau Pako. For services to the community.
- Dr. Nivritti Gajanan Patil. For services to medicine.
- Michael Simon Raes. For services to the community.
- Superintendent Alfred Reu. For services to the Royal Papua New Guinea Constabulary.
- Sister Nedi Tariowai. For services to health.
- Senior Inspector Huitona ToHua. For services to the Royal Papua New Guinea Constabulary.
- John Bili Tokome. For services to broadcasting and sport.
- Miss Janice Waddy. For services to sport.
- Chief Superintendent Gerald David Walker. For services to the Royal Papua New Guinea Constabulary.
- Chief Inspector Peter White. For services to the Royal Papua New Guinea Constabulary.
- John Yangumei. For services to local government

Military Division

- Lieutenant Colonel Andrew Noni Trongat. For services to the Papua New Guinea Defence Force.

=== Imperial Service Order (ISO) ===
- Pomat Paliau. For public service.

=== British Empire Medal (BEM) ===
Civil Division

- Mako Ambe. For services to local government.
- Unape Apojo. For services to the community.
- Anne, Mrs. Barnabas. For services to education.
- Sergeant Peter Charles Bayagau. For services to the Royal Papua New Guinea Constabulary.
- Su Bel. For services to Government House.
- Yakotong Saki David. For services to the community.
- Kese Dugi. For services to local government.
- John Ekusio. For public service.
- The Reverend Pearson Gar. For services to the community.
- Paul Suru Gorogo. For public service.
- Dennis Haova. For public service.
- Nelson Hungrabos. For public service.
- Peki Imaura. For public service.
- Harriet, Mrs. Jack. For services to public health.
- John Kambori. For services to the community.
- Elipas Kaplimut. For services to education.
- The Reverend Lega Dai Katam. For services to the community.
- Francis Sibe Kepas. For public service.
- Police Sergeant Baku Koibi. For services to the Royal Papua New Guinea Constabulary.
- Tan Konz. For public service.
- Senior Constable Felix Kranden, For services to the Royal Papua New Guinea Constabulary.
- Nanowa Lopasi. For services to local government.
- Eric Mangui. For services to education..
- Allen Maniana. For services to rural health.
- Mathias Nalu. For services to education.
- Peter Pitilai. For services to health.
- Casper Reure. For public service.
- Saba Savara. For services to the community.
- Miss Scola Sengu. For public service.
- Joseph Sipere. For public service.
- Kwata Tan. For public service.
- The Reverend Len Tarut. For services to the community.
- Theodore Tauvasa. For services to the community.
- Senior Constable Allan ToLire. For services to the Royal Papua New Guinea Constabulary.
- Senior Constable Wesley ToNiut. For services to the Royal Papua New Guinea Constabulary.
- Peiwa Waea. For services to sport.
- Olaphi Wangat. For services to public health.
- First Constable William Warabe. For services to the Royal Papua New Guinea Constabulary.
- ToWalia Wartovo. For public service.

Military Division

- Sergeant Elias Arakua. For services to the Papua New Guinea Defence Force.
- Sergeant Daniel Kemmeran Ilaea. For services to the Papua New Guinea Defence Force.
- Warrant Officer Second Class John Maree. For services to the Papua New Guinea Defence Force.
- Sergeant Moia Michael Pissa. For services to the Papua New Guinea Defence Force.

=== Queen's Police Medal (QPM) ===
- Chief Superintendent Kaumu Ludwick. For services to the Royal Papua New Guinea Constabulary.
- Chief Superintendent John Yampery Marru. For services to the Royal Papua New Guinea Constabulary.
- Assistant Commissioner Matthew Minok. For services to the Royal Papua New Guinea Constabulary.
- Acting Chief Superintendent Michael Andrew Turner. For services to the Royal Papua New Guinea Constabulary.

== Solomon Islands ==
=== The Most Excellent Order of the British Empire ===
==== Knight Commander of the Order of the British Empire (KBE) ====
- Mariano Kelesimalefo Tuita, OBE, For services to commerce.

==== Officer of the Order of the British Empire (OBE) ====
- Daniel Maemaruki. For services to medicine.

==== Member of the Order of the British Empire (MBE) ====
- John Lee. For services to the construction industry.
- Joseph Ta'akihenua Puia. for services to education.

=== British Empire Medal (BEM) ===
- Benjamin Buko. For services to the community.
- Johnson Kengalu. For services to commerce.
- Lee Kwok Kuen. For services to commerce.
- Lemeck Dorovoga Qae. For public service.

== Tuvalu ==
=== The Most Excellent Order of the British Empire ===
==== Officer of the Order of the British Empire (OBE) ====
- Pafini Nouata. For services to education.

==== Member of the Order of the British Empire (MBE) ====
- Laloniu Samuelu. For services to education.
- Pasoni Taafaki. For public service.

== Saint Vincent and the Grenadines ==
=== The Most Excellent Order of the British Empire ===
==== Member of the Order of the British Empire (MBE) ====
- Miss Sarah Baptiste. For services to the community.
- Miss Esther Theresa Simmons. For services to the community.

== Belize ==
=== The Most Excellent Order of the British Empire ===
==== Commander of the Order of the British Empire (CBE) ====
- Jane Ellen Mary, Mrs. Usher. For services to the community.

==== Officer of the Order of the British Empire (OBE) ====
- Froylan Gilharry Sr. For services to the community.
- Robert Clifton Swift Sr. For public services.

==== Member of the Order of the British Empire (MBE) ====
- Greta Coralie Althea, Mrs. Mossiah. For public service.
- Anthony Sylvestre. For public service.
- Maria Eloisa, Mrs. Trujeque. For services, to education.

== Antigua and Barbuda ==
=== The Most Excellent Order of the British Empire ===
==== Officer of the Order of the British Empire (OBE) ====
- Miss Genevieve Lewis Irene Benjamin, MBE

== Saint Christopher and Nevis ==
=== The Most Excellent Order of the British Empire ===
==== Officer of the Order of the British Empire (OBE) ====
- Matilda, Mrs. Warner. For services to the community.
