= Marion Tait =

Former ballerina and ballet mistress

Marion Hooper Tait CBE is a former ballerina and ballet mistress, and assistant director of Birmingham Royal Ballet since 2011.

Tait was appointed an Officer of the Order of the British Empire (OBE) in the 1992 New Year Honours, and promoted to Commander (CBE) in the 2003 Birthday Honours for services to dance.

Tait was named Dancer of the Year 1994 and received the Evening Standard Ballet Award for Outstanding Performance.

In Birmingham Royal Ballet's 2013 production of The Sleeping Beauty, Tait played the wicked fairy Carabosse.
