= Klaus Werner Wedell =

British educational psychologist

Klaus Wedell CBE was a British educational psychologist and innovator of national and international importance in educational psychology and in special educational needs (SEN), with respect to theoretical and conceptual developments, professional practice and policy.

== Early life ==
Klaus Wedell was born in Dusseldorf, Germany in 1931 and came with his family to Britain as a refugee from Nazi Germany aged seven. He started school in England without speaking English and began a sojourn from place to place and school to school. The family, classed as ‘enemy aliens’, lived from hand to mouth with acute privations. Eventually in August 1943 circumstances became more stable as they moved to Wistow, a residential training college for Germans preparing to return to Germany to help rebuild the country after the war. Private funding enabled the teenage Klaus to continue his education at Bryanston School.

From Bryanston, Wedell went on to study Psychology and Philosophy at King's College University of Cambridge (1950–53). During his National Service (1953–55) he served in the British Army in Germany; he wasn’t much good as a tank unit leader due to his disinclination to give orders, but his bilingual skills were put to good use at brigade headquarters. He then undertook his PhD at the University of Bristol, supported by a Spastics Society Studentship, on the perceptuo-motor problems of children with cerebral palsy.

Klaus married Nina (nee Weaver) in 1956, when both were post-graduate students. They had two children, Stephen (born 1962) and Katherine (born 1964).

Klaus’s family background and the experience of being a refugee both had a powerful influence on his life. His forebears had a strong vocation to public service: on his father Hans’s side the Jewish Wedells and on his mother Gertrud’s side the Christian Bonhoeffers.

== Work ==
- After completing his PhD, Wedell worked as an educational psychologist for the City of Bristol (1960–64), where he set up a unit for children with hearing impairment. From 1964-65 he was the senior educational psychologist for the City of Hull.
- In 1965 he moved to the University of Birmingham and was appointed Course Director of the M.Ed (Ed. Psych) professional training course for educational psychologists in 1970.
- In 1979, he was appointed to the inaugural Chair in Educational Psychology (Children with Special Educational Needs) at the Institute of Education University College London, from which he retired in 1995.

=== Policy and Legislation ===
- Wedell initiated a major change in EP training and practice on the Educational Psychology training course in Birmingham, with trainees going into schools, rather than working in child guidance clinics.
- Wedell was Chair of the British Psychological Society Division of Educational and Child Psychology (DECP) and its Training Committee of Tutors in Educational Psychology.
- He led the DECP Inquiry into Psychological Services for Children (1977), co-authoring a report in 1980 and gave evidence to the Warnock Committee.
- Following the 1981 Education Act, Wedell was concerned with the implementation of the Act in practice. He was commissioned by the Department of Education and Science (DES) to lead a major research project evaluating the implementation of the Act, leading to the book Policy and Provision for Special Educational Needs (Goacher et al., 1988).
- He served on the Inner London Education Authority (ILEA) committee, chaired by John Fish, to review its provision for pupils with special educational needs. The committee recommended that schools should form 'clusters' to collaborate to serve the needs of pupils with SEN. Wedell worked with a 'cluster' of schools in Camden (visiting them by bicycle from his office at the Institute of Education).
- He served as a consultant to the DES/Department of Health Management Development Project, which applied management of change concepts to the development of inter-service decision-making on SEN provision, and explored the use of clusters as a strategy.
- Wedell then obtained ESRC-grant funding for a research project to collaborate with colleagues to study the impact of clusters in relation to SEN provision.
- Wedell lobbied for special educational needs provision through the passage of the 1988 Education Reform Act, the 1993 Education Act, and the 1994 Code of Practice.

=== Consultancies and Development of SEN Provision Worldwide ===
- He served as a consultant internationally, including with the British Council in India, the Organisation for Economic Co-operation and Development in Europe, the National Council on Disability in the USA, and UNESCO. He contributed over 15 years to UNESCO's review of teacher education curricula across Member States, which formed the basis of UNESCO’s Teacher Education Resource Pack. In 1994 he contributed to the Salamanca World Conference on Special Needs Education.
- He was instrumental in co-founding the European Journal of Special Needs Education.

=== Organising Education for Diversity and Inclusion ===
- In the mid 1980s Wedell directed a major research project looking at curriculum modification practices in special and mainstream schools, one result of which was the training resource Pathways to Progress (Evans et al, 1990).

=== The SENCO Forum ===
- In 1995 Wedell founded the SENCo Forum, an email chatroom for Special Needs Co-ordinators in schools to share problems and solutions. He set this up in collaboration with BECTA, seizing the innovative opportunities which email provided at the time.
- In 1998 he was asked by the Editor of the British Journal of Special Education (BJSE) to write a quarterly column, discussing key themes and concerns arising from SENCos' posts on the Forum. These were published over 23 years as 'Points from the SENCo Forum', Wedell's last column published in October 2021, just short of his 90th birthday. Themes arising included a wide range of issues, many of which focussed on government policy, such as those discussed in the 'Points from the SENCo Forum: Putting the 2014 Code of Practice into practice', which was submitted as evidence for parliamentary select committee deliberation.

== Key Ideas in Wedell's Conceptual Development ==
- PhD research and move away from classification

Wedell's PhD research was framed within the prevailing model of classification: analysing children's learning difficulties by starting from predetermined classifications of difficulty, located within the child. From this research, Wedell concluded that such classification could not adequately address children's learning needs. In his 1973 book Learning and Perceptuo-motor Disabilities in Children, he expressed frustration with the concept of classifying children with learning disabilities, describing it as 'an exercise of limited value', and instead discussed the importance of the interaction between the learner's strengths and needs and their school and home environment.

- Towards compensatory interaction

From these findings, the concept of 'compensatory interaction' emerged as a model for assessing children's special educational needs. This model moved away from both classifications of learning difficulty and seeing learning difficulties wholly as deficits within the child. Instead, compensatory interaction conceptualised learning difficulties as interactions between strengths and needs within the child and advantages and disadvantages in their environment, considered over time.

- Innovative changes in Educational Psychology training

Wedell initiated a major change in EP training and practice on the Educational Psychology training course in Birmingham, with trainees going into schools, rather than working in child guidance clinics. The compensatory interaction model required that Educational Psychologists should assess children's learning difficulties and needs within their educational and home settings.

- Prediction and assessment of learning difficulties

Wedell was concerned with the early identification of children's special educational needs. The work that he and colleagues did in this area indicated the significant difficulty of finding a measure that could predict the educational progress of children with apparently similar problems.

- The 'I and I' Strategy

At the Institute of Education, Wedell promoted and refined what he called the 'I and I Strategy' - to investigate and intervene in the individual case': an approach opposed to the use of generalisations and the fitting of pupils to general patterns. What was generally applicable for Wedell was the process of investigation and intervention. The starting point was the learning objective; and the strategy was one of investigating the strengths and needs of the individual and their environment in relation to the learning objective, and in the light of those strengths and needs to find interventions that would work for that individual, rather than applying generalised, ready-made solutions.

- Special educational needs are relative

Wedell promoted the concept of special educational needs as relative: a learner's needs depend on the learning objectives, and if the objective is changed, the special educational need may change or disappear. Additionally, a learner's difficulties may be relative to their other learning characteristics and their learning environment.

- Education for inclusion and diversity

Arising from the principle of inclusion and the recognition of the diversity of learning needs, Wedell became concerned with curriculum modification and systems of organising learning, considering how educational contexts can respond to pupil diversity. . He recognised the complexity and dilemmas of inclusion. He advocated that educational provision should maximise organisational and pedagogical flexibility and recognised that Information Technology could be an instrument in achieving this.

- Collaboration

Collaboration was a key concept in all of Wedell's thinking about the delivery of special educational needs provision. The 1981 Education Act required education, health and social services to work together to address the needs of young people with a Statement of Special Educational Need. Wedell not only focused on the practical implications of this requirement but went further. He stressed the need for collaboration at all levels as a basic principle of good practice. For example, at the Institute of Education he collaborated with local authorities in the disbanded ILEA to provide in-service training; he was very active in the SEN Policy Research forum, a broad network of all concerned with SEN, including families, to examine and debate SEN policy issues; and he developed links between statutory, professional, and voluntary organisations, both in lobbying and in service delivery.

== Publications ==
Wedell, K. (1960) ‘The visual perception of cerebral palsied children’, Journal of Child Psychology and Psychiatry, 1, pp. 217–27.

Wedell, K. (1964) ‘Some aspects of perceptual-motor development in young children’, in J. Loring (ed.) Learning Problems of the Cerebral Palsied, London: Spastics Society.

Wedell, K. (1970) ‘Diagnosing learning difficulties: A sequential strategy’, Journal of Learning Difficulties, 3(6), pp. 23–9.

Wedell, K. (1971) ‘Perceptuo-motor factors’, in B. Keogh (ed.) ‘Early Identification of Children with Potential Learning Problems’, Journal of Special Education, 4, pp. 223–31.

Wedell, K. (1973) Learning and Perceptuo-motor Disabilities in Children, London: John Wiley.

Wedell, K. (1978) ‘Early Identification and Compensatory Education’ paper presented at the NATO International Conference on Learning Disorders, Ottawa.

Wedell, K. (1980) ‘Early identification and compensatory interaction’, in R.M. Knights and D.J. Bakker (eds) Treatment of Hyperactive and Learning Disordered Children: Current Research, Baltimore University Park Press

Wedell, K. (1989) ‘Some developments in the concepts and practice of special education’ (unpublished manuscript).

Wedell, K. (1990) ‘The 1988 Act and current principles of special educational needs’ in H. Daniels and J. Ware (eds) Special Educational Needs and the National Curriculum, London: Institute of Education / Kogan Page.

Wedell, K. (1993) ‘Special Needs Education: The Next 25 Years’, National Commission on Education Briefing, 14, London: NCE

Wedell, K. (1994) ‘Conclusions’, in I Lund and J. Evans (eds) Allocating Resources for Special Educational Needs Provision, Stafford: NASEN Enterprises.

Wedell, K. and Raybould, E.C. (1976) ‘The early identification of educationally ‘at risk’ children’, Educational Review, Occasional Publications No. 6. University of Birmingham.

Wedell, K. and Lambourne, R. (1979) An Enquiry into Psychological Services for Children in England and Wales, Birmingham: University of Birmingham, Department of Educational Psychology.

Wedell, K. and Lambourne, R. (1979) Psychological Services for Children in England and Wales, Social Science Research Council.

Wedell, K. and Lambourne, R. (1980) ‘Psychological services for children in England and Wales’, DECP Occasional Papers, 4(1) and (2), pp. 1–84

Wedell, K. and Lindsay, G. (1980) ‘Early identification procedures: What have we learned?’ Remedial Education, 15, pp. 130–5.

Wedell, K. (1995). Making inclusive education ordinary. British Journal of Special Education.

'Points from the SENCo Forum': regular column in the British Journal of Special Education from 1997 to 2021.

Wedell, K. (2005). Dilemmas in the quest for inclusion. British Journal of Special Education.

Wedell, K. (2008). Confusion about inclusion: patching up or system change? British Journal of Special Education.

== Awards ==
- In 1992 Wedell was awarded the CBE
- In 1993 he was made Honorary Fellow, British Psychological Society
