= Andrew Hugh Smith =

Sir Andrew Hugh Smith
- Born: 6 September 1931
- Died: 3 October 2012 (aged 81)
- Education: Ampleforth College; Trinity College, Cambridge
- Occupation: Businessman
- Known for: Chairman of the London Stock Exchange, 1988 to 1994

Sir Andrew Colin Hugh Smith (6 September 1931 – 3 October 2012) was a British businessman, most notably chairman of the London Stock Exchange from 1988 to 1994.

== Early life and education ==
Andrew Colin Hugh Smith was the son of a lieutenant-commander in the British Navy. His forebears had founded Nottingham-based Smith’s Bank (which was subsequently bought by National Westminster Bank).

Following schooling at Ampleforth College and a period of national service, Hugh Smith studied History and Law at Trinity College, Cambridge.

== Career ==
After graduation, Hugh Smith spent four years practicing law before at Inner Temple. He subsequently spent eight years working for textile firm Courtaulds between 1960 and 1968.

In 1968, Hugh Smith followed the family path to work in the City of London, joining stockbroker Capel-Cure Myers. In 1979 he became senior partner at Capel-Cure Myers. In anticipation of ”Big Bang”, he oversaw the sale of Capel-Cure Myers to ANZ Merchant Bank, of which he became Deputy Chairman.

Having been on the court of the London Stock Exchange since 1980, Hugh Smith succeeded Sir Nicholas Goodison as chairman in 1988. His time at the London Stock Exchange was noteworthy for the attempts to modernise its infrastructure. The attempts to create a new settlement system through a project called TAURUS (share settlement) had to be abandoned, but the foundations for the CREST (securities depository) system had been put in place by the time he retired in 1994.

Hugh Smith was knighted in 1992.
