= British Road Federation =

The British Road Federation was a business organisation representing stakeholders of the road industry in the United Kingdom. The organisation was active since 1932 and ceased to exist in 2000. It represented companies and trade associations of the road construction, engineering, car manufacturing, transport, haulage and courier industries, road services and oil interests. It maintained a network of local groups, including Yorkshire Roads Group, Transport Action Scotland and East Anglia Roads to Prosperity. Chief executive Richard Diment formerly spent eight years in Conservative Central Office, and press officer Andrew Pharoah several years at the Labour Party. The BRF has claimed responsibility for the motorway network developed in the '60s, '70s and '80s

== Publications ==
The BRF published over 400 titles including position papers, reports and annual statistical guides.

== Related ==
- Freight Transport Association
- Road Haulage Association
- Roads Campaign Council
- Roads in the United Kingdom
- Transport in the United Kingdom

== See also ==
Additional archival holdings at http://mrc-catalogue.warwick.ac.uk/records/MSX/2114B
