= Poliakoff =

Poliakoff is a surname, a variant of Polyakov. It may refer to:

- Alexander Poliakoff, Russian-born British electronics engineer, inventor and businessman, father of Martyn and Stephen
- Élie de Poliakoff, Russian-born equestrian
- Joseph Poliakoff, Russian-born British telephone and sound engineer and inventor, father of Alexander
- Martyn Poliakoff, Professor of Chemistry at the University of Nottingham, brother of Stephen
- Nicolai Poliakoff, British clown, born in Latvia
- Serge Poliakoff, Russian-born French modernist painter
- Stephen Poliakoff, British playwright, director and scriptwriter, brother of Martyn
- Marina Catherine de Poliakoff-Baydaroff, birth name of Marina Vlady, French actress, sister of Odile
- Étiennette de Poliakoff-Baydaroff, birth name of Odile Versois, French actress, sister of Marina
