= City Sugar =

Stage play by Stephen Poliakoff

City Sugar is a stage play by Stephen Poliakoff. It was originally staged at the Bush Theatre in 1975 and directed by Hugh Thomas. City Sugar's cast was led by John Shrapnel as Leonard Brazil and supported by Leon Vitali and Lynne Miller. In 1976 the play then transferred to the Comedy Theatre with Adam Faith taking over as Leonard Brazil and James Aubrey as Rex. City Sugar, along with its companion piece Hitting Town, won Poliakoff the Evening Standard's Most Promising Playwright Award in 1976.

The play was widely performed in regional cities all over Britain, and was presented at the Phoenix Theatre in New York City with Jeff Goldblum in the lead role and was made into a successful ITV television play with Tim Curry playing the lead.

City Sugar followed the story of the young waitress, Nicola, whom the audience first encountered in Poliakoff's Hitting Town.

== Storyline ==
The story charts a week in the life of a DJ, Leonard Brazil, as he launches what he calls the competition of the century aimed directly at a youth audience. It is a promotional campaign designed to whip up excitement amongst the station's audience in preparation for a super-group's visit to the city. As Leonard runs the competition, he is tormented by self-loathing and takes out his anger on those around him. He singles out Nicola Davies, one of his listeners and engineers, and she came into the studio where he purposefully humiliated her.

== Further Information ==
The TV production was made with Scottish TV and Film Enterprises for ITV. In the television version Nicola Davies was played by Veronica Quilligan and Tim Curry plays the DJ Leonard Brazil. It was shot on film on location in Glasgow.

City Sugar has been included as a suggested text in UK GCSE curriculum in drama. Hereford Plays published an edition of City Sugar in 1989 with scene-by-scene analysis, structured questions and assignment suggestions for GCSE.

The play's text is published by Bloomsbury and Samuel French.
