= Close My Eyes (film) =

1991 film by Stephen Poliakoff

- US promotional poster for the film
- Directed by: Stephen Poliakoff
- Written by: Stephen Poliakoff
- Produced by: Therese Pickard
- Starring: Alan Rickman; Clive Owen; Saskia Reeves
- Cinematography: Witold Stok
- Music by: Michael Gibbs
- Production company: FilmFour International
- Distributed by: Artificial Eye
- Release date: 6 September 1991
- Running time: 100 minutes
- Country: United Kingdom
- Language: English
- Budget: £1.2 million
- Box office: £268,248 (UK)

Close My Eyes is a 1991 British drama film written and directed by Stephen Poliakoff and starring Alan Rickman, Clive Owen and Saskia Reeves as well as Lesley Sharp and Karl Johnson. Music was by Michael Gibbs and the film was produced for Beambright and FilmFour International by Therese Pickard. It had a limited theatrical release from 6 September 1991, before being shown in Channel 4's Film on Four strand on 28 October 1993.

== Plot ==
In 1985, town planning student Richard Gillespie visits his older sister Natalie, with whom he is not very close since they grew up separately. Natalie has recently split with her boyfriend and is unhappy with her job. She is depressed, and Richard's attempts to lighten the mood are ended when Natalie pulls him into a passionate embrace, kissing him on the lips. She immediately apologises, making the excuse that she just wanted someone to hug. Richard seems stunned, but not disturbed.

Six years pass, during which Richard achieves success while Natalie's career stagnates; she marries a powerful and rich stock analyst named Sinclair Bryant. When Richard visits Natalie, he is introduced to Sinclair and the two get along well. Shortly after Richard's visit to her home, Natalie goes to Richard's apartment. They attempt to resist their attraction to one another, but eventually they succumb to their desires and have sex. They meet a few more times and eventually Sinclair begins to suspect that Natalie is having an affair. He questions Richard, believing Richard knows who Natalie's lover is.

Some time later, after learning that Sinclair and Natalie plan to move to America, Richard has an emotional breakdown. He attempts to commit suicide with sleeping pills, but Natalie arrives unexpectedly at his apartment. She invites him to the going-away party, on the condition that he not attempt to renew their affair. He attends with his colleague Jessica, but abandons her to search for Natalie. On finding her, the two have a fight, then return to the gathering dishevelled. Sinclair appears, and staying calm, makes it clear that he knows what has happened.

== Cast ==
- Alan Rickman as Sinclair
- Clive Owen as Richard
- Saskia Reeves as Natalie
- Karl Johnson as Colin
- Lesley Sharp as Jessica
- Kate Garside as Paula
- Niall Buggy as Geof

== Themes ==
The film is largely a grand-scale re-working of Poliakoff's earlier stage play Hitting Town in that the main plot remains one of brother/sister incest, and the film re-uses some lines from that play in dialogue between the brother and sister characters. Beyond this, the film also covers the chaos (as the film sees it) that was the initial stages of the London Docklands development, the late 1980s recession and attitudes towards AIDS. A parallel thread running through the movie is the rapacious replacement of the classical by the modern, represented visually by old and new buildings.

== Locations ==
The film was shot mainly in London and, specifically, London Docklands with Sinclair and Natalie's house being in Marlow, Buckinghamshire. The grand party that is the stage for the film's climax was shot at Polesden Lacey in Bookham, Surrey. The final scenes along the river are at Henley-on-Thames, Oxfordshire.

== Reception ==
On review aggregator Rotten Tomatoes, 67% of six reviews are positive, and the average rating is 6/10.

== Awards ==
The film won the Evening Standard film award for Best British Picture of 1992.

== Home media ==
The film was originally released on VHS video by Artificial Eye and is available on DVD in the UK and the US on the Cinemaclub label. The film has an 18 certificate in the UK and an R Certificate in the US.
