= Robert Lindsay (actor) =

English actor (born 1949)

- Born: Robert Lindsay Stevenson; 13 December 1949 (age 76); Ilkeston, Derbyshire, England
- Education: Nottingham College; Royal Academy of Dramatic Art (BA)
- Occupations: Actor; narrator
- Years active: 1968–present
- Spouses: Cheryl Hall (m. 1974; div. 1980) Rosemarie Ford (m. 2006)
- Partners: Sherrie Hewson (1970–1972); Diana Weston (1980–1995)
- Children: 3

Robert Lindsay Stevenson (born 13 December 1949), known professionally as Robert Lindsay, is an English actor. He has appeared with the Royal Shakespeare Company and in musical theatre, and is the recipient of a British Academy Television Award, a Tony Award, and two Laurence Olivier Awards.

Lindsay's most notable roles on television were playing Jakey Smith in Get Some In! (1975-1977), Wolfie in Citizen Smith (1977–1980), Micky Noades in Give Us a Break (1983–1984), and Ben Harper in My Family (2000–2011). His other screen credits include Much Ado About Nothing (1984), Bert Rigby, You're a Fool (1989), G.B.H. (1991), Hornblower (1998–2003), Jericho (2005), Friends and Crocodiles (2006), and Gideon's Daughter (2006).

== Early life ==
Lindsay was born 13 December 1949, in Ilkeston, Derbyshire, to Joyce (née Dunmore) and Norman Stevenson, a joiner. He was one of three children and his father was a World War II veteran, having been on a minesweeper.

Lindsay attended Gladstone Boys' School, in Ilkeston, then enrolled in the drama department of Clarendon College in Nottingham. His friends at Nottingham Playhouse encouraged him to apply to the Royal Academy of Dramatic Art (RADA), and in 1968, and he was accepted there with the aid of a government grant. He graduated in 1970 with an Acting (RADA Diploma).

== Career ==
Lindsay's early career included roles in British films such as That'll Be The Day (1973), Three for All (1975), and Adventures of a Taxi Driver (1976). He came to prominence as the cockney Teddy Boy Jakey Smith in the ITV comedy series Get Some In! (1975–1977), that was based on National Service life in the RAF. In 1977, he landed the starring role as delusional revolutionary Wolfie Smith in the BBC sitcom Citizen Smith (1977–1980). He had now become a television star watched by 24 million people.

Lindsay won roles in the BBC Television Shakespeare series, including Lysander in A Midsummer Night's Dream (1981), Fabian in Twelfth Night (1980), and Benedick in Much Ado About Nothing (1984). He played Edmund in the Granada Television production of King Lear (1983).

He played the role of Bill Snibson alongside Emma Thompson in the 1984 London revival of Me and My Girl, for which he won an Olivier Award, which subsequently transferred to Broadway, earning him a Tony Award.

He played the starring role in the film Bert Rigby, You're a Fool (1989), and appeared in the James Scott-directed Strike It Rich (1990), alongside Molly Ringwald and John Gielgud. He continued to have success on television, and played the leading role in Alan Bleasdale's dark comedy serial G.B.H. (1991), winning the British Academy Television Award for Best Actor for his performance as Michael Murray.

Lindsay was also in Bleasdale's Jake's Progress (1995), the tale of a couple played by Lindsay and Julie Walters who were struggling to cope with a 'difficult' child (Barclay Wright). Both Bleasdale serials were screened by Channel 4, as was the surreal Channel 4 sitcom Nightingales (1990–1993), which also featured David Threlfall and James Ellis. In 1996, Lindsay played the title role of Becket, the play by Jean Anouilh, opposite Derek Jacobi as King Henry II for which was nominated for the Laurence Olivier Award for Best Actor. In 1997, Lindsay played the role of Fagin in Cameron Mackintosh's London revival of Oliver! at the London Palladium, for which he won the Laurence Olivier Award for Best Actor in a Musical.

Lindsay appeared alongside John Cleese, Michael Palin and Jamie Lee Curtis in the comedy film Fierce Creatures (1997). In 1998, he appeared in Divorcing Jack (1998). The same year, he was cast in the recurring role of Captain Pellew in the ITV mini-series Hornblower, based on the novels by C.S. Forester which ran until 2003.

He later appeared as Fagin in the 1999 ITV Oliver Twist miniseries. His longest-running role has been Ben Harper in the popular BBC sitcom My Family (2000–2011), playing the role for over a decade.

In October 2005, he starred in ITV drama series Jericho about a Scotland Yard detective investigating murder and kidnapping in London's Soho in the 1950s. In January and February 2006, he was the only actor (as Sneath) to appear in two loosely linked Stephen Poliakoff dramas, Friends and Crocodiles, and Gideon's Daughter, shown on BBC One.

Lindsay portrayed Prime Minister Tony Blair in the Channel 4 satires A Very Social Secretary and The Trial of Tony Blair. In 2003, he appeared in an episode of Absolutely Fabulous, playing the character of Pete, an old musician boyfriend of Edina Monsoon (Jennifer Saunders), and narrated the BBC documentary series Seven Wonders of the Industrial World (2003).

He appeared in the 8th Ricky Gervais Video Podcast, in which Gervais announced that Lindsay would be in the second series of Extras, appearing in the last episode of the 2006 series as an arrogant, mean-spirited version of himself. Lindsay also appeared in the romantic comedy Wimbledon, as the tennis club manager who hires Peter Colt. In 2007, at the Old Vic Theatre, Lindsay played Archie Rice in John Osborne's The Entertainer, a role first performed by Olivier in 1957. In 2009, he played the protagonist, Maddox, from the Radio 4 comedy Electric Ink by Alistair Beaton.

In 2010, Lindsay starred in the title role of Derby Live's production of Onassis before its transfer to London's West End. He played the same role in Grace of Monaco. In November 2011, he starred as Henry in a revival of The Lion in Winter by James Goldman at the Theatre Royal, Haymarket, London, a production which also featured Joanna Lumley as Eleanor, and was directed by Trevor Nunn. In 2011, he starred as The Examiner in the British sitcom Spy.

In 2012, Lindsay appeared in the Sky detective series Falcón, episode "The Silent and the Damned", as Pablo Ortega. In 2014, Lindsay starred as Lawrence in the UK première production of Dirty Rotten Scoundrels at Savoy Theatre London, directed and choreographed by Jerry Mitchell.

In 2016, Lindsay recurred on the second season of the ABC fairy tale-themed musical comedy series Galavant as Chester Wormwood, an evil wizard/wedding planner.

In 2017, Lindsay played Hermann Einstein in the National Geographic TV series Genius. He also played Jack Cardiff in Prism at the Hampstead Theatre.

In 2019, Lindsay played supporting role of King John in Disney's Maleficent: Mistress of Evil. The film starred Angelina Jolie, Elle Fanning, Michelle Pfeiffer, Chiwetel Ejiofor, and was released on 18 October 2019. In 2020, he appeared in the series McDonald & Dodds.

Lindsay starred as Moonface Martin in a revival of Anything Goes, directed by Kathleen Marshall, at the Barbican Theatre from July to November 2021. He received his fourth Olivier Award nomination, which was his third for Best Actor in a Musical, in 2022.

== Personal life ==
In 1974, Lindsay married Cheryl Hall, who later appeared opposite him in Citizen Smith. They divorced in 1980, when he started a long-term relationship with actress Diana Weston, with whom he has a daughter, Sydney Laura Stevenson, and who co-starred with him in three episodes of My Family. He married English actress, dancer, and television presenter Rosemarie Ford on 31 December 2006.

On 13 September 2006, Lindsay researched his family tree in the third series of Who Do You Think You Are? He travelled to his hometown and to Turkey, where his grandfather, Raymond Dunmore, had taken part in the Gallipoli campaign during World War I.

Lindsay is a lifelong supporter of Derby County F.C., which he revealed in a short section on the CBBC programme Newsround entitled "My Team".

Lindsay is known for his left-wing political beliefs, usually describing himself as a staunch socialist, and has marched in support of miners. He is a passionate supporter of the Labour Party, but an outspoken critic of then Prime Minister Tony Blair's controversial decisions to go to war in Afghanistan and Iraq in 2001 and 2003, saying that he was "furious" and feeling disillusioned with mainstream politics: "You see those images of Iraq and Afghanistan and Lebanon, don't you? And I suspect somewhere, when he goes home at night and the kids are in bed, he must go, 'Jesus, what have I done?'"

In 2011, he was diagnosed with prostate cancer, which was treated surgically.

On 1 October 2016, Lindsay was given the Freedom of the Borough of Erewash.

Lindsay has suffered from depressive episodes and symptoms of seasonal affective disorder in winter months for most of his life. He has spoken publicly about his positive experiences with light therapy and counselling, saying that "they really do work".

== Credits ==
=== Film ===
Year	Title	Role	Notes
1973	That'll Be the Day	Terry	
1975	Three for All	Tom	
1976	Adventures of a Taxi Driver	Tom	
1989	Bert Rigby, You're a Fool	Bert Rigby	
1990	Strike It Rich	Ian Bertram	
1993	Genghis Cohn	Otto Schatz	
1996	Goodbye My Love	Derek Humphry	
1997	Fierce Creatures	Sydney Small Mammals	
1997	Remember Me?	Jamie	
1998	Divorcing Jack	Michael Brinn	
2004	Wimbledon	Ian Frazier	
2014	Grace of Monaco	Aristotle Onassis	
2019	Maleficent: Mistress of Evil	King John	
2022	A Midsummer Night's Dream	Oberon	

=== Television ===
Year	Title	Role	Notes
1973	Love Story	Colin	Episode: "Finders Keepers"
1973	The Roses of Eyam	Francis Thornley	Television film
1973	ITV Sunday Night Theatre	Sam	Episode: "A Question of Everything"
1974	Centre Play	Toby	Episode: "Hurt Hawks"
1975	Centre Play	Ken	Episode: "Letter from a Soldier"
1975	Thriller	Policeman at roadblock	Episode: "The Crazy Kill"
1975	Doctor on the Go	Harrison	Episode: "What's Op Doc?"
1975	Whodunnit?	Dave	Episode: "Pop Goes the Weasel"
1975–1977	Get Some In!	Jakey Smith	Series regular. Series 1–4; 27 episodes
1977	The Good Life	Reform School Youth	Episode: "Our Speaker Today"
1977–1980	Citizen Smith	Wolfie Smith	Main Character. Series 1–4; 30 episodes
1980–1984	BBC Television Shakespeare	Various roles	4 episodes
1981–1982	Seconds Out	Pete Dodds	Series regular. Series 1 & 2; 13 episodes
1983	King Lear	Edmund	Television film
1983–1984	Give Us a Break	Micky Noades	Series regular; 8 episodes
1984	Jackanory	Storyteller	5 episodes: "The Kitchen Warriors: Parts 1–5"
1989	Confessional	Thomas Kelly	Mini-series; 4 episodes
1990–1993	Nightingales	Carter	Series regular. Series 1 & 2; 13 episodes
1991	G.B.H.	Michael Murray	Mini-series; 7 episodes
1994	The Wimbledon Poisoner	Henry Farr	Mini-series; 2 episodes
1995	Strange Landscape	The Divine Comedy	Episode: "The Circles of Light"
1995	Jake's Progress	Jamie Diadoni	Mini-series; 8 episodes
1996	The Office	Norman Platt	Television film
1996	Tales from the Crypt	Glynn Fennell	Episode: "Ear Today... Gone Tomorrow"
1996	Brazen Hussies	Billy Bowmans	Television film
1996–2000	Brambly Hedge	Narrator	8 episodes (UK version)
1998	In Your Dreams	Narrator	1 episode
1998–2000	The Canterbury Tales	Harry Bailey (voice)	Animated version; 2 episodes
1998–2003	Hornblower	Captain Sir Edward Pellew	Series regular; 8 episodes
1999	Oliver Twist	Fagin	Mini-series; 3 episodes
1999	Secrets of the Ancients	Narrator	Docuseries; 5 episodes
2000	Victoria Wood with All the Trimmings	Various characters	Television Special
2000	Jack the Ripper: An On-Going Mystery	Narrator	Television documentary film
2000–2011	My Family	Ben Harper	Main role. Series 1–11; 118 episodes
2001	Hawkins	Luke Hawkins	Television film
2001	Don't Eat the Neighbours	Rabbit	(unknown episodes)
2001	Eddy and the Bear	Bear (voice)	(unknown episodes)
2002	Out of Eden	Narrator	Television documentary film
2003	Seven Wonders of the Industrial World	Narrator	Docuseries; 7 episodes
2003	Absolutely Fabulous	Pete	Episode: "Schmoozin'"
2005	Friends and Crocodiles	William Sneath	Television film
2005	Space Race	Narrator	Docuseries; 2 episodes
2005	A Very Social Secretary	Tony Blair	Television film
2005	Gideon's Daughter	Sneath	Television film
2005	Jericho	D.I. Michael Jericho	Mini-series; 4 episodes
2005	Unsolved History	Narrator	Docuseries; episode: "Unstoppable Wave"
2006	Extras	Himself	Episode: "Jonathan Ross"
2007	The Trial of Tony Blair	Tony Blair	Television film
2010	The One... Ronnie	Animal Agent	Television film
2011	George and Bernard Shaw	George	Television film
2011–2012	Spy	The Examiner	Series regular. Series 1 & 2; 17 episodes
2012	Falcón	Pablo Ortega	Mini-series; episode: "The Silent and the Damned"
2013–2015	Atlantis	Daedalus	6 episodes
2015	Bull	Rupert Bull	3 episodes
2016	Galavant	Chester Wormwood	Series 2; 8 episodes
2017	Genius	Hermann Einstein	2 episodes: "Einstein: Chapters One & Three"
2017	Bounty Hunters	Nigel Walker	4 episodes
2017	The Secret Life of Owls	Narrator	Docuseries; 2 episodes
2018	Plebs	Crassus	Episode: "The Accident"
2020	McDonald & Dodds	Max Crockett	Episode: "The Fall of The House of Crockett"
2022	Dodger	William Lamb	Episode: "Christmas"
2024	Sherwood	Franklin Warner	Series 2; 6 episodes
2024	Generation Z	Morgan	Series regular; 6 episodes
2026	Big Mood	Mark	Series 2; 2 episodes: "Leagues" & "Hands"
2026	Missed Call	Andrew Taylor	5 episodes

=== Theatre ===
Year	Title	Role	Venue
1977	Leaping Ginger	Ginger	Royal Exchange Theatre, Manchester
1979	The Three Musketeers	D'Artagnan	Royal Exchange Theatre, Manchester
1979	The Changeling	Antonio	Riverside Studios, London
1980	The Cherry Orchard	Peter Trofimov	Royal Exchange Theatre, Manchester
1980	The Lower Depths	Vassilly Pepic	Royal Exchange Theatre, Manchester
1980	Trelawny of the 'Wells'	Tom Wrench	The Old Vic, London
1982	The Beaux' Stratagem	Archer	Royal Exchange Theatre, Manchester
1982	Philoctetes	Neoptolemus	Royal Exchange Theatre, Manchester
1983	Hamlet	Hamlet	Royal Exchange Theatre, Manchester
1985	Me and My Girl	Bill Snibson	Adelphi Theatre, London
1986	Me and My Girl	Bill Snibson	Marquis Theatre, Broadway
1991	Becket	Henry II	Theatre Royal Haymarket, London
1992	Cyrano de Bergerac	Cyrano de Bergerac	Theatre Royal Haymarket, London
1996	Oliver!	Fagin	London Palladium, London
1999	Richard III	Richard III	Savoy Theatre, London
2003	Power	Nicolas Fouquet	Royal National Theatre, London
2007	The Entertainer	Archie Rice	The Old Vic, London
2008	Aristo	Aristotle Onassis	Minerva Theatre, Chichester
2010	Onassis	Aristotle Onassis	Novello Theatre, London
2011	The Lion in Winter	Henry II	Theatre Royal Haymarket, London
2014	Dirty Rotten Scoundrels	Lawrence Jameson	Savoy Theatre, London
2016	A Christmas Carol: In Concert with the London Musical Theatre Orchestra	Ebenezer Scrooge	Lyceum Theatre, London
2017	Prism	Jack Cardiff	Hampstead Theatre, London and UK Tour (2019)
2018	In Praise of Love	Sebastian Cruttwell	Theatre Royal, Bath
2021	Anything Goes	Moonface Martin	Barbican Theatre, London
2022	The Fever Syndrome	Richard Myers	Hampstead Theatre, London
2023	Bleak Expectations	Sir Philip “Pip” Bin	Criterion Theatre, London
2026	Springwood	Franklin D. Roosevelt	Hampstead Theatre

== Awards and nominations ==
BAFTA TV Awards

Year	Category	Work	Result
1992	Best Actor	G.B.H.	Won
1996	Best Actor	Jake's Progress	Nominated
2002	Best Comedy Performance	My Family	Nominated

Olivier Awards

Year	Category	Work	Result	Ref.
1985	Best Actor in a Musical	Me and My Girl	Won	
1992	Best Actor	Becket	Nominated	
1993	Best Comedy Performance	Cyrano de Bergerac	Nominated	
1997	Best Actor in a Musical	Oliver!	Won	
2022	Best Actor in a Musical	Anything Goes	Nominated	

Tony Awards

Year	Category	Work	Result	Ref.
1987	Best Actor in a Musical	Me and My Girl	Won	

Other awards

Year	Award	Category	Work	Result
1982	Manchester Evening News Theatre Award	Best Actor	Philoctetes	Won
1985	Drama Desk Award	Outstanding Actor in a Musical	Me and My Girl	Won
1985	Theatre World Award		Me and My Girl	Honouree
1992	Broadcasting Press Guild Award	Best Actor	G.B.H.	Won
1992	Royal Television Society Award	Best Male Actor	G.B.H.	Won
2003	National Television Award	Most Popular Comedy Performance	My Family	Nominated
2006	Online Film & Television Association Award	Best Actor in a Motion Picture or Miniseries	Jericho	Nominated
2007	Satellite Award	Best Actor in a Miniseries or a Motion Picture Made for Television	The Trial of Tony Blair	Nominated
