= Ciara Charteris =

Rwandan actress

- Born: 3 August 1995 (age 31); Johannesburg, South Africa
- Education: King's College London; Royal Welsh College of Music & Drama
- Years active: 2010–present

Ciara Charteris (born 3 August 1995) is a South African-born British producer, writer, activist, and former actress. She is known for her role as Emma Tregirls in the BBC One period drama Poldark (2017–2018). She co-founded I Am Arla, a survivors' support network, before launching IntAct Creatives.

== Early life and education ==
Charteris was born in Johannesburg, South Africa. In January 1998 at three years old, she moved to the Clapham area of South West London with her family as her parents' careers were taking off, her father Roger's as a talent agent and producer, and her mother Robyn's as a writer.

Charteris attended Queen's College in central London for secondary school. As a child, she was a dancer and joined the National Youth Music Theatre. She went on to train at the Royal Welsh College of Music & Drama before withdrawing during her second year when she was cast in Close to the Enemy.

After quitting acting in 2019, Charteris pursued a Master of Science in the Psychology and Neuroscience of Mental Health at King's College London. She then received ICF training in Personal and Business Coaching from Barefoot Coaching.

== Career ==
Charteris began her acting career in 2010 where she appeared in the film Mum's List directed by Niall Johnson. In 2016, she played Lucy Lindsay-Jones, the niece of Alfred Molina's character, in the BBC Two 1940s-set miniseries Close to the Enemy. The following year, she played Harriet Shelley in the biographical film Mary Shelley starring Elle Fanning. She made guest appearances in the ITV detective dramas Endeavour and Grantchester. That same year, she joined the cast of the BBC One period drama Poldark as Emma Tregirls, a role she would play for its third and fourth series.

== Personal life ==
In 2020, Charteris revealed that she had been raped in September 2015 by a close friend during a night out for her friend's birthday. It took her until December 2019 to build up the courage to report it to the police, though it did not result in a conviction.

== Bibliography ==
- Essay in Instructions For A Teenage Armageddon, curated by Rosie Day (2021)

== Filmography ==
Year	Title	Role	Notes
2010	Mum's List		
2016	Acres and Acres	Olivia	
2016	Close to the Enemy	Lucy Lindsay-Jones	Miniseries
2017	Endeavour	Nurse Flora Byron	Episode: "Lazaretto"
2017	Poison Tree	Phaedra	Short film
2017	Grantchester	Annie Towler	1 episode
2017	Mary Shelley	Harriet Shelley	
2017–2018	Poldark	Emma Tregirls	Recurring role (series 3–4)
2022	WoMum	—N/a	Executive producer
