= Lindsay Duncan =

Scottish actress (born 1950)

Lindsay Duncan CBE
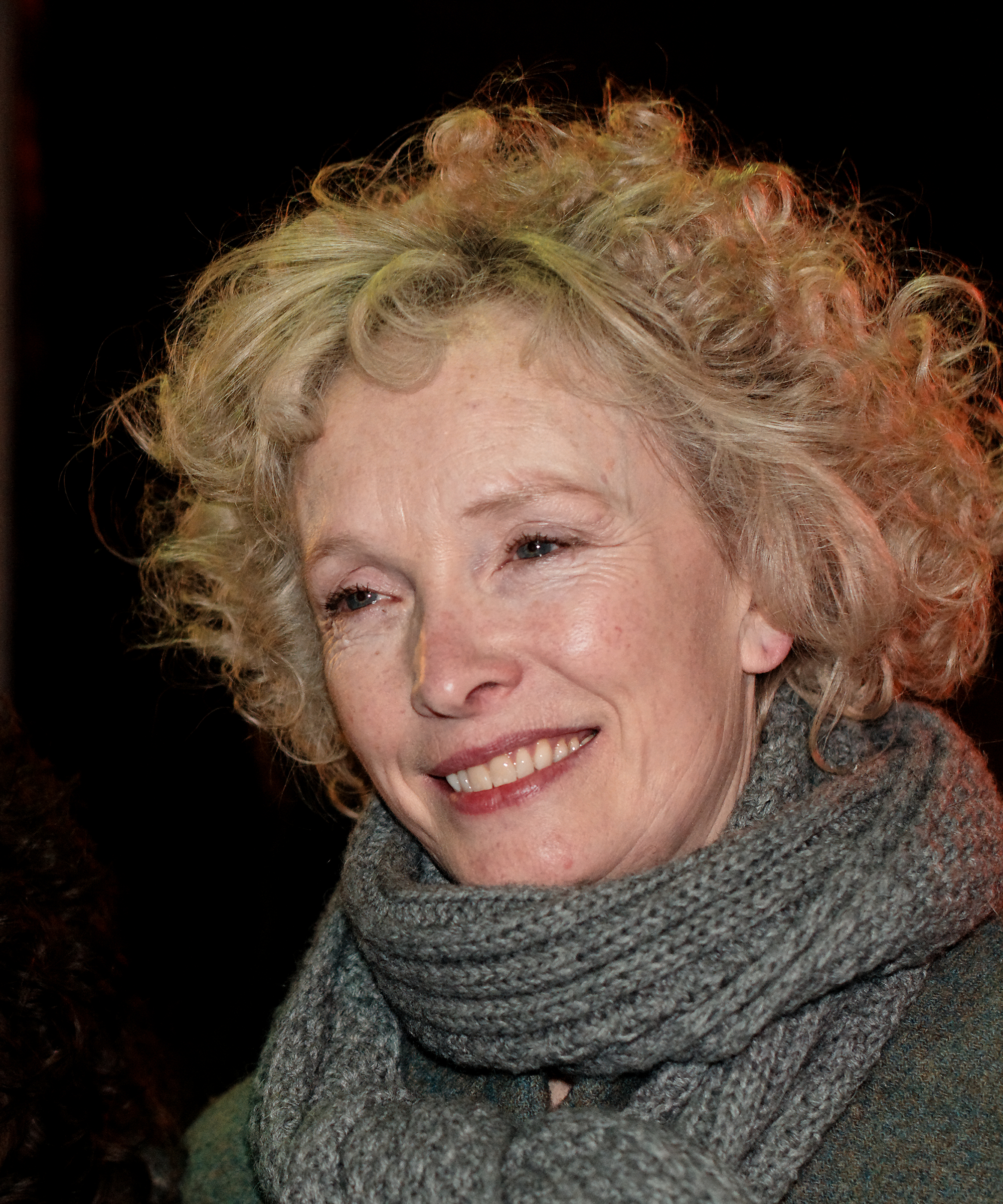
- Duncan in 2011
- Born: Lindsay Vere Duncan; 7 November 1950 (age 76); Edinburgh, Scotland
- Education: Royal Central School of Speech and Drama
- Occupation: Actress
- Years active: 1975–present
- Spouse: Hilton McRae
- Children: 1

Lindsay Vere Duncan (born 7 November 1950) is a Scottish actress. She is the recipient of three BAFTA nominations and one Scottish BAFTA nomination, as well as two Olivier Awards and a Tony Award for her work on stage.

She has starred in several plays by Harold Pinter. Duncan's film credits include Prick Up Your Ears (1987), The Reflecting Skin (1990), City Hall (1996), An Ideal Husband, Star Wars: Episode I – The Phantom Menace, Mansfield Park (all 1999), Under the Tuscan Sun, AfterLife (both 2003), Starter for 10 (2006), Tim Burton's Alice in Wonderland (2010), About Time (2013), Birdman (2014), and Blackbird (2019).

Outside of stage and film, Duncan appeared as Barbara Douglas in Alan Bleasdale's critically acclaimed G.B.H. (1991), Servilia of the Junii on the HBO historical drama series Rome (2005–2007), Adelaide Brooke in the Doctor Who special "The Waters of Mars" (2009), Anjelica Hayden-Hoyle in the BBC Two miniseries The Honourable Woman (2014), and Lady Smallwood on BBC One's Sherlock (2014–2017). She also portrayed Elizabeth Longford and Margaret Thatcher in the television films Longford (2006) and Margaret (2009), respectively.

== Early life and education ==
Duncan was born into a working-class family in Scotland; one parent was from Edinburgh and the other from Glasgow. Her father had served in the British army for 21 years before becoming a civil servant. Her parents moved to Leeds, then Birmingham, when she was still a child. She attended King Edward VI High School for Girls in Birmingham through a scholarship.

Despite her origins, she speaks with a received pronunciation accent. Roles in which she uses her Scottish accent are AfterLife (2003) and the BBC crime drama Mint.

Duncan's father died in a car accident when she was 15. Her mother was affected by Alzheimer's disease and died in 1994; she inspired Sharman Macdonald to write the play The Winter Guest (1995), directed by Alan Rickman, which he later adapted as a film.

== Career ==
Duncan's first contact with theatre was through school productions. She became friends with future playwright Kevin Elyot, who attended the neighbouring King Edward's School for boys, and followed him to Bristol, where he read Drama at university. She did a number of odd jobs while staging her own production of Joe Orton's Funeral Games.

Duncan joined London's Central School of Speech and Drama at the age of 21. After her training, she started out in summer weekly rep in Southwold to gain her Equity card. She appeared in two small roles in Molière's Don Juan at the Hampstead Theatre in 1976, and joined the Royal Exchange Theatre, Manchester when it opened. She performed in the first productions at the Royal Exchange and appeared in eight plays in Manchester in the next two years. In 1978 she returned to London in Plenty by David Hare at the National. She appeared on the television in small roles in a special episode of Up Pompeii!, in The New Avengers, and a commercial for Head & Shoulders shampoo.

She made her breakthrough on Top Girls by Caryl Churchill, staged at the Royal Court in London and later transferred to the Public Theater in New York, Her performance as Lady Nijo, a 13th-century Japanese concubine, won her an Obie, her first award.

The following year, she took her first major role on film in Richard Eyre's Loose Connections with Stephen Rea. At the same time her television work included a filmed version of Frederick Lonsdale's On Approval (1982), Reilly, Ace of Spies (1983) and Dead Head (1985).

In 1985, she joined the Royal Shakespeare Company for the production of Troilus and Cressida, in which she played Helen of Troy. In September she created the role of the Marquise de Merteuil in Les Liaisons Dangereuses, the play by Christopher Hampton after the French novel by Choderlos de Laclos, which opened at The Other Place in Stratford-upon-Avon. On 8 January 1986, the production transferred to the 200-seat theatre The Pit in London's Barbican Centre, with its original cast. In October of that year, the production moved to the Ambassadors in the West End. In April 1987, the cast, including Duncan, took the play to Broadway. For her performance, she was nominated for a Tony and won the Olivier Award for Best Actress and a Theatre World Award. She was replaced by Glenn Close for Dangerous Liaisons — Stephen Frears's film of the play; similarly John Malkovich was selected for the role of Valmont instead of Duncan's co-star Alan Rickman.

In 1988, Duncan won an Evening Standard Award for her role of Maggie in Cat on a Hot Tin Roof by Tennessee Williams. At the same time, she became a regular in the plays of Harold Pinter and the television work of Alan Bleasdale and Stephen Poliakoff. In 1994–95, she performed for a second season with the RSC in A Midsummer Night's Dream, in the double role of Hippolyta and Titania, replacing Stella Gonet from the original production cast. She went on tour in the United States with the rest of the cast, but back and neck pains forced her to be replaced by Emily Button from January to March 1997. Impressed by her performance in David Mamet's The Cryptogram (1994), Al Pacino asked Duncan to play the role of his wife in the film City Hall (1996) by Harold Becker.

To please her young son, a Star Wars fan, Duncan applied for the role of Anakin Skywalker's mother in Star Wars: Episode I – The Phantom Menace (1999) but was not cast; she finally accepted to voice an android TC-14. She reunited with Alan Rickman in a revival of Noël Coward's Private Lives (2001–02) and won a Tony Award for Best Actress and a second Olivier Award for her performance as Amanda Prynne; she was also nominated that year for her role in Mouth To Mouth by Kevin Elyot.

Duncan played Servilia Caepionis in the 2005 HBO-BBC series Rome, and starred as Rose Harbinson in Starter for 10. Aged by make-up, she played Lord Longford's wife, Elizabeth, in the TV film Longford. Also in 2005, Duncan played the character Angela Wells in BBC's spy series Spooks, featuring in series 4 episode 10 and series 5 episode 1. The storyline was controversial as Duncan's character suspects the royal family is involved in the death of Princess Diana. In February 2009, she played British Prime Minister Margaret Thatcher in Margaret. In November 2009, she played Adelaide Brooke, companion to the Doctor, in the second of the 2009 Doctor Who specials. She played Alice's mother in Tim Burton's 2010 film Alice in Wonderland, alongside Mia Wasikowska, Johnny Depp and Helena Bonham Carter. She also starred in the original London run of Polly Stenham's play That Face at the Royal Court co-starring Matt Smith and directed by Jeremy Herrin. She narrated the Matt Lucas and David Walliams 2010/2011 fly-on-the-wall mockumentary series Come Fly with Me on the BBC. In October–November 2010, she starred in a new version by Frank McGuinness of Ibsen's John Gabriel Borkman at the Abbey Theatre, Dublin alongside her Liaisons dangereuses co-stars Alan Rickman and Fiona Shaw. The production transferred in January–February 2011 to the Brooklyn Academy of Music.

Alan Bleasdale asked Duncan to appear in his first work for television after ten years of absence, The Sinking of the Laconia, aired in January 2011. She played an upper-class passenger in the two-part drama based on a true story of World War II. She also played the mother of Matt Smith in the telefilm Christopher and His Kind written by Kevin Elyot after Christopher Isherwood's autobiography of the same title. In October–November 2011, Duncan read extracts of the King James Bible at the National Theatre, London as part of the 400th anniversary celebrations of the translation. She played Queen Annis, ruler of Caerleon and antagonist of Merlin, in the 5th episode of the fourth series of BBC1's Merlin. She also appeared as Home Secretary Alex Cairns to Rory Kinnear's Prime Minister in "The National Anthem", the first episode of Charlie Brooker's anthology series Black Mirror.

Duncan started 2012 as a guest in the New Year special of Absolutely Fabulous, playing Saffy's favourite film actress, Jeanne Durand. In February, she returned to the West End in Noël Coward's Hay Fever with Kevin McNally, Jeremy Northam and Olivia Colman, once again under the direction of Howard Davies. Later in 2012, she was featured in BBC2's productions of Shakespeare's history plays. She played the Duchess of York in the first film, Richard II, with David Suchet as the Duke of York and Patrick Stewart as John of Gaunt.

In October 2014, Duncan appeared as Claire in the revival of Edward Albee's A Delicate Balance on Broadway. That year, she also appeared in the film Birdman, or (The Unexpected Virtue of Ignorance), which won the Academy Award for Best Picture. She also appeared in A Discovery of Witches from 2018-2022. In 2023, Duncan starred in The Morning Show.

In 2024, Duncan starred in The National Theatre’s revival of Dear Octopus.

== Personal life ==
Duncan is married to fellow Scottish actor Hilton McRae, whom she met in 1985 at the Royal Shakespeare Company. They live in north London. They have one son, Cal McRae, born September 1991.

Duncan was appointed a Commander of the Order of the British Empire (CBE) in the 2009 Birthday Honours for services to drama.

== Acting credits ==
Key
†	Denotes films that have not yet been released

=== Film ===
Year	Title	Role	Notes	Ref.
1983	Loose Connections	Sally		
1985	Samson and Delilah	Alice Nankervis	Short	
1987	Prick Up Your Ears	Anthea Lahr		
1988	Manifesto	Lily Sachor		
1989	The Child Eater	Eirwen	Short	
1990	The Reflecting Skin	Dolphin Blue	Sitges - Catalan International Film Festival Award for Best Actress	
1991	Body Parts	Dr. Agatha Webb		
1996	City Hall	Sydney Pappas		
1996	A Midsummer Night's Dream	Hippolyta / Titania	From the 1994–1995 Royal Shakespeare Company stage production	
1999	An Ideal Husband	Lady Markby		
1999	Star Wars: Episode I – The Phantom Menace	TC-14 (voice)		
1999	Expelling the Demon	Woman (voice)	Short	
1999	Mansfield Park	Mrs. Price / Lady Bertram		
2003	AfterLife	May Brogan	Bratislava International Film Festival Award for Best Actress; Bowmore Scottish Screen Award	
2003	Under the Tuscan Sun	Katherine		
2004	The Queen of Sheba's Pearls	Audrey Pretty		
2006	Starter for 10	Rose Harbinson		
2009	Burlesque Fairytales	Ice Queen		
2010	Alice in Wonderland	Helen Kingsleigh		
2013	Last Passenger	Elaine Middleton		
2013	About Time	Mary Lake (Mum)		
2013	Le Week-End	Meg Burrows		
2014	Birdman or (The Unexpected Virtue of Ignorance)	Tabitha Dickinson	Screen Actors Guild Award for Outstanding Performance by a Cast in a Motion Picture	
2016	Alice Through the Looking Glass	Helen Kingsleigh		
2016	He Does Not Want Peace	Rachel Englebright	Short	
2017	Gifted	Evelyn Adler		
2017	The Dying Hours	Jane	Short	
2019	Little Joe	Psychotherapist		
2019	Blackbird	Liz		
2019	My Zoe	Kathy		
2019	November 1st	Bonnie	Short	
2020	Made in Italy	Kate		
2021	No Ordinary Joe	Marion Barbara 'Joe' Carstairs	Short	
2021	A Banquet	June		
2022	Last Call	Kate	Short	
2023	Doctor Jekyll	Sandra Poole		
2023	Call Me Back	Grace	Short	
2025	H Is for Hawk	Helen's mother		
2026	The Intimacy Coordinator	Denise	Short	
TBA	The Entertainment System Is Down †	Eva	Post-production	
TBA	Daughter of Eden †	Emer	Post-production	

=== Television ===
Year	Title	Role	Notes	Ref.
1975	Up Pompeii!	Scrubba	Series, special episode: "Further Up Pompeii!"	
1976	One-Upmanship	(unknown)	Series, episode: "Womanship"	
1977	The New Avengers	Jane	Series, episode: "Angels of Death"	
1979	ITV Playhouse	Diane	Series, episode: "The Winkler"	
1980	Dick Turpin	Catherine Langford	Series, episode: "Deadlier Than the Male"	
1980	ITV Playhouse	Madelene	Series, episode: "New Girl in Town"	
1980	BBC2 Playhouse	Christine Butcher	Series, episode: "Grown-Ups", directed by Mike Leigh	
1982	Muck and Brass	Jean Torrode	Mini-series, episodes: "World of Sport", "Public Relations", and "Our Green and Pleasant Land"	
1982	Play of the Month	Helen Hayle	Filmed production of Frederick Lonsdale's play On Approval	
1983	Reilly, Ace of Spies	Alexandra, 'The Plugger'	Series, episode: "After Moscow"	
1984	Play for Today	Karen Miller	Series, episode: "Rainy Day Women"	
1984	The Brief	Carol Barnes	Series, episode: "And Then Where Do You Go?"	
1984	Travelling Man	Andrea	Series, episodes: "First Leg", "The Collector", "The Watcher", "Grasser", "Moving On", and "Sudden Death"	
1986	Dead Head	Dana Cass	Mini-series, episodes: "Why Me?", "Anything for England", and "The Patriot"	
1986	Kit Curran	Pamela Scott	Series, all 6 episodes	
1988	Alas Smith & Jones	Various characters	Series, episode: "Alas Sage & Onion"	
1988, 1990	Colin's Sandwich	Rosemary	Series, episodes: "Enough" (1988) and "Zanzibar" (1990)	
1989	The Play on One	Gutrune Day	Series, episode: "These Foolish Things"	
1989	Traffik	Helen Rosshalde	Mini-series, all 6 episodes. Written by Simon Moore	
1990	TECX	Laura Pellin	Series, episode: "Getting Personnel"	
1991	The Storyteller: Greek Myths	Medea	Series, episode: "Theseus & the Minotaur"	
1991	ScreenPlay	Kath Peachey	Series, episode: "Redemption"	
1991	G.B.H.	Barbara Douglas	Mini-series, 6 episodes. Written by Alan Bleasdale; Nominated – TV BAFTA for Best Actress	
1993	A Year in Provence	Annie Mayle	Mini-series, all 12 episodes. After Peter Mayle's book	
1994	The Rector's Wife	Anna Bouverie	Series, all 4 episodes. After the novel by Joanna Trollope	
1995	Just William	Lady Walton	Mini-series, episode: "William Clears the Slums"	
1995	Jake's Progress	Monica	Mini-series, 5 episodes	
1997	The History of Tom Jones, A Foundling	Lady Bellaston	Mini-series, episodes: 1, 3, 4, and 5. After the novel by Henry Fielding	
1998	Get Real	Louise	Series, all 7 episodes	
1999	Shooting the Past	Marilyn Truman	Mini-series, 3 episodes. Written and directed by Stephen Poliakoff; Nominated – TV BAFTA for Best Actress	
1999	Oliver Twist	Elizabeth Leeford	Mini-series, all 4 episodes. Adapted by Alan Bleasdale after Charles Dickens' novel	
2000	Dirty Tricks	Alison	Television film	
2000	Victoria Wood with All The Trimmings	Pauline	Christmas Special, segment: "Women Institute"	
2001	Perfect Strangers	Alice	Mini-series, all 3 episodes. Written and directed by Stephen Poliakoff; Nominated — TV BAFTA for Best Actress	
2001	Witness of Truth: The Railway Murders	Narrator (voice)	Television film	
2001	Hamilton Mattress	Beryl / Gertrude (voice)	Television film	
2002	Arena	Rose	Series, episode: "Harold Pinter – Part 1: The Room"	
2003	Meet the Ancestors	Narrator (voice)	Documentary series, episode: "Napoleon's Lost Army"	
2005	Agatha Christie's Poirot	Lady Tamplin	Series, episode: "The Mystery of the Blue Train"	
2005–2006	Spooks	Angela Wells	Series, episodes: "Diana" and "Gas and Oil: Part One"	
2005–2007	Rome	Servilia of the Junii	Series, 18 episodes	
2006	Longford	Lady Elizabeth Longford	Television film	
2007	Frankenstein	Professor Jane Pretorius	Television film	
2008	Criminal Justice	Alison Slaughter	Series, episodes 3–5	
2008	Lost in Austen	Lady Catherine de Bourgh	Mini-series, episodes 3 and 4	
2009	Margaret	Margaret Thatcher	Television film Nominated – Scottish BAFTA Award for Best Actress	
2009	Doctor Who	Adelaide Brooke	Autumn 2009 Special: "The Waters of Mars"	
2009	Margot	Ninette de Valois	Television film	
2010	Arena	Various characters	Series, episode: "Harold Pinter: A Celebration"	
2010	Agatha Christie's Marple	Marina Gregg	Episode: "The Mirror Crack'd from Side to Side"	
2010	Mission: 2110	Neuros / Cybele	Children's game show, 13 episodes	
2010–2011	Come Fly with Me	Narrator (voice)	Series, all 6 episodes	
2011	The Sinking of the Laconia	Elisabeth Fullwood	2-part television film. Written by Alan Bleasdale	
2011	Christopher and His Kind	Kathleen Isherwood	Television film. Written by Kevin Elyot after Christopher Isherwood's autobiography	
2011	Against the Wall	Faith Kowalski	Police-crime drama television series, episode: "We Have a Cop in Trouble Here"	
2011	Black Mirror	Home Secretary Alex Cairns	Series, first episode: "The National Anthem". Written by Charlie Brooker	
2011–2012	Merlin	Queen Annis	Series, episodes: "His Father's Son" and "Arthur's Bane: Part One"	
2012	Absolutely Fabulous	Jeanne Durand	Series, episode: "Job"	
2012	White Heat	Lilly (present day)	Series, 6 episodes. Written by Paula Milne	
2012	Richard II	Duchess of York	Filmed production of the Shakespeare play as part of The Hollow Crown BBC Two series	
2012	Wallander	Monika Westin	Series, episode: "Before the Frost"	
2012	Spy	The Director	Series, episode: "Codename: Citizen Lame" and Christmas Special: "Codename: Show Stopper"	
2013	Count Arthur Strong	Dame Agnes	Series, episode: "The Radio Play"	
2013	Lawless	Lady Justice MacNeill	Television film	
2013	You, Me & Them	Lydia Walker	Series regular, 6 episodes	
2014	Playhouse Presents	Mrs. Dalloway	Series, episode: "Foxtrot"	
2014	The Honourable Woman	Anjelica Hayden-Hoyle	Series, 8 episodes	
2014–2017	Sherlock	Lady Smallwood	Series, episodes: "His Last Vow", "The Six Thatchers", and "The Lying Detective"	
2015	Toast of London	Herself	Series, episode: "Global Warming"	
2016	Churchill's Secret	Clementine Churchill	Television film	
2016	Close to the Enemy	Frau Bellinghausen	Mini-series, 4 episodes. Written & directed by Stephen Poliakoff	
2017	Carnage	Maude Polikoff	Television mockumentary film	
2017	The Leftovers	Grace Playford	Series, 5 episodes	
2018–2022	A Discovery of Witches	Ysabeau de Clermont	Series, 15 episodes	
2020–2022	His Dark Materials	Octavia (voice)	Series, episodes: "The Cave", "Malice", and "The Intention Craft"	
2021	Inside No. 9	Loretta Lamb	Series, episode: "Simon Says"	
2021	Around the World in 80 Days	Jane Digby	Series, episode: 1.3	
2022	The Split	Countess Caroline	Series, episode: 3.1	
2022	Sherwood	Jennifer Hale	Series, episode: 1.4	
2023	The Wheel of Time	Anvaere Damodred	Series (Amazon Prime Video), 2nd season, 5 episodes	
2023–2025	The Morning Show	Martha Ellison	Series (Apple TV+), 3rd and 4th seasons, episodes: "Strict Scrutiny", "If Then", and "The Parent Trap"	
2024	Truelove	Phil	Mini-series (Channel 4); lead role, 6 episodes	
2025	The Death of Bunny Munro	Doris Pennington	Series (Sky Atlantic); supporting role, episodes: "Family Man" and "Showman"	
2026	Mint	Ollie	Series (BBC One); main cast, 6 episodes	
2026	The Party	Lady Katherine Fitzmaurice	Series (ITV1); 5 episodes	

=== Theatre ===
Year	Title	Role	Notes	Ref.
1976	Dom Juan	Charlotte / Violetta	Hampstead Theatre, London	
1976	The Script	(unknown)	Hampstead Theatre, London	
1976	Zack	Sally Teale	Royal Exchange Theatre, Manchester	
1976	The Rivals	Lucy	Royal Exchange Theatre, Manchester	
1976	The Prince of Homburg	Natalie	Royal Exchange Theatre, Manchester	
1977	The Deep Blue Sea	Anne	Cambridge Arts Theatre	
1977	The Ordeal of Gilbert Pinfold	Margaret	Royal Exchange Theatre, Manchester	
1977	What the Butler Saw	Geraldine Barclay	Royal Exchange Theatre, Manchester	
1977	The Skin of Our Teeth	Gladys	Royal Exchange Theatre, Manchester	
1977	Present Laughter	Daphne	Royal Exchange Theatre, Manchester	
1977	Twelfth Night	Viola	Royal Exchange Theatre, Manchester	
1978	Plenty	Dorcas	National Theatre, London	
1978	Comings and Goings	Hilary	Hampstead Theatre, London	
1979	The Recruiting Officer	Sylvia	Bristol Old Vic / Edinburgh Festival	
1980	Julius Caesar	Portia	Riverside Studios, London	
1980	The Provoked Wife	Belinda	National Theatre, London	
1981	Incident at Tulse Hill	Rosemary	Hampstead Theatre, London	
1982	Top Girls	Lady Nijo / Win	Royal Court Theatre, London / Joe Papp's Public Theater, New York; Won – Obie Award	
1984	Progress	Ronnie	Bush Theatre, London	
1985–1986	Troilus and Cressida	Helen	Royal Shakespeare Company: Stratford-upon-Avon / Barbican Theatre	
1985–1986	Les Liaisons dangereuses	Marquise de Merteuil	Royal Shakespeare Company: Ambassadors Theatre, London / Music Box Theater, New York; Won – Olivier Award for Best Actress and a Theatre World Award; nominated – Tony Award for Best Actress	
1985–1986	The Merry Wives of Windsor	Mistress Ford	Royal Shakespeare Company: Stratford-upon-Avon / Barbican Theatre	
1988	Cat on a Hot Tin Roof	Maggie	National Theatre, London; Won – Evening Standard Theatre Award	
1988	Hedda Gabler	Hedda Gabler	Hampstead Theatre, London	
1990	Bérénice	Bérénice	National Theatre, London	
1993	Three Hotels	Barbara Boyle	Tricycle Theatre, London	
1994	The Cryptogram	Donny	Ambassadors Theatre, London	
1995	A Midsummer Night's Dream	Titania / Hippolyta	Royal Shakespeare Company: Barbican Theatre, London / Lunt Fontanne Theater, New York	
1996	Ashes to Ashes	Rebecca	Gramercy Theater, New York	
1997	The Homecoming	Ruth	National Theatre, London	
2000	Celebration / The Room	Prue / Rose (double bill)	Almeida Theatre, London	
2001	Mouth to Mouth	Laura	Albery Theatre, London; Won – Critics' Circle Theatre Award; nominated – Olivier Award, Evening Standard Award	
2001–2002	Private Lives	Amanda Prynne	Albery Theatre, London / Richard Rodgers Theater, New York; Won – Olivier Award for Best Actress, Tony Award for Best Actress in a Play, Critics' Circle Theatre Award, Drama Desk Award and Variety Club Award; nominated – Evening Standard Award	
2007	That Face	Martha	Royal Court Theatre / Duke of York's Theatre; Nominated – Olivier Award for Best Actress	
2010	John Gabriel Borkman	Ella Rentheim	Abbey Theatre, Dublin / Brooklyn Academy of Music, New York	
2012	Hay Fever	Judith Bliss	Noël Coward Theatre, London	
2014	A Delicate Balance	Claire	John Golden Theater, New York	
2019	Hansard	Diana	National Theatre, London	
2022	The Dance of Death	Alice	Arcola Theatre, London / Tour	
2024	Dear Octopus	Dora	Lyttelton Theatre, National Theatre London	

=== Advertising ===
Year	Title	Product	Ref.
1979	Head & Shoulders	Shampoo	

== Awards and nominations ==
=== British Academy of Film and Television Arts ===
Year	Category	Nominated work	Result	Ref.
British Academy Television Awards
1992	Best Actress	G.B.H.	Nominated	
2000	Best Actress	Shooting the Past	Nominated	
2002	Best Actress	Perfect Strangers	Nominated	
British Academy Scotland Awards
2009	Best Actress - Television	Margaret	Nominated	

=== Laurence Olivier Awards ===
Year	Category	Nominated work	Result	Ref.
Laurence Olivier Awards
1986	Actress of the Year	Les Liaisons Dangereuses	Won	
2002	Best Actress	Private Lives	Won	
2002	Best Actress	Mouth to Mouth	Nominated	
2009	Best Actress	That Face	Nominated	

=== Tony Awards ===
Year	Category	Nominated work	Result	Ref.
Tony Awards
1987	Best Actress in a Play	Dangerous Liaisons	Nominated	
2002	Best Actress in a Play	Private Lives	Won	

=== Evening Standard Theatre Awards ===
Year	Category	Nominated work	Result	Ref.
Evening Standard Theatre Awards
1988	Best Actress	Cat on a Hot Tin Roof	Won	
2001	Best Actress	Mouth to Mouth / Private Lives	Nominated	
