= Ellen Barkin =

American actress (born 1954)

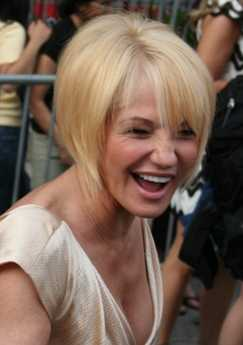
- Barkin at the Ocean's Thirteen premiere in 2007
- Born: Ellen Rona Barkin; April 16, 1954 (age 72); The Bronx, New York, U.S.
- Education: Hunter College
- Occupation: Actress
- Years active: 1978–present
- Spouses: Gabriel Byrne (m. 1988; div. 1999); Ronald Perelman (m. 2000; div. 2006)
- Partner: Sam Levinson (2008–2011)
- Children: 2

Ellen Rona Barkin (born April 16, 1954) is an American actress. Her breakthrough role was in the 1982 film Diner, and in the following years, she had starring roles in films such as Tender Mercies (1983), Eddie and the Cruisers (1983), The Adventures of Buckaroo Banzai Across the 8th Dimension (1984), The Big Easy (1986), Johnny Handsome, and Sea of Love (both 1989).

In 1991, for her leading role in the film Switch, Barkin received a Golden Globe nomination for Best Actress. Her subsequent film credits include: Man Trouble (1992), Into the West (1992), This Boy's Life (1993), Bad Company (1995), Wild Bill (1995), The Fan (1996), Fear and Loathing in Las Vegas (1998), Drop Dead Gorgeous (1999), Crime and Punishment in Suburbia (2000), Palindromes (2004), Trust the Man (2005), Ocean's Thirteen (2007), Brooklyn's Finest (2009), and The Cobbler (2014).

In 1998, Barkin received a Primetime Emmy Award for her performance in the television film Before Women Had Wings. In 2011, she received the Tony Award for Best Featured Actress in a Play for her Broadway theatre debut in The Normal Heart. From 2016 until 2019, she played the leading role of Janine "Smurf" Cody on the TNT drama series Animal Kingdom. From 2012 until 2013, she played the leading role of Jane Forrest on the NBC sitcom The New Normal.

Her producing credits include the films Letters to Juliet, Shit Year (both 2010), and Another Happy Day (2011).

== Early life ==
Barkin was born on April 16, 1954, in the Bronx, New York, the daughter of Evelyn (née Rozin), a hospital administrator who worked at Jamaica Hospital, and Sol Barkin, a chemical salesman. Her family is Jewish; they emigrated from Siberia and the Ukrainian–Polish border.

Barkin lived in Flushing, New York, and attended Parsons Junior High School. She received her high school diploma at Manhattan's High School of Performing Arts. She then attended Hunter College and double majored in history and drama. At one point, Barkin wanted to teach ancient history. She continued her acting education at New York City's Actors Studio. According to Time, she studied acting for 10 years before landing her first audition.

== Career ==
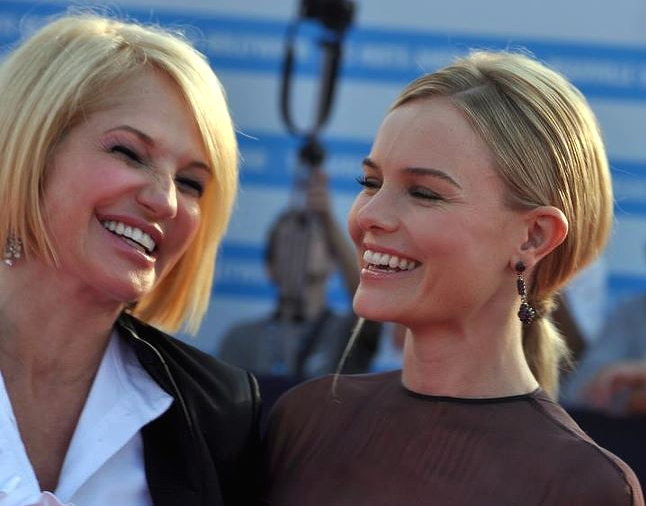
Ellen Barkin and Kate Bosworth at the Deauville American Film Festival in 2011

Her break-out role was in the comedy-drama film Diner (1982), written and directed by Barry Levinson, for which she received favorable reviews. Barkin was cast in the drama film Tender Mercies (1983) after impressing its director Bruce Beresford during an audition in New York City, despite her inexperience and his lack of familiarity with her work. Robert Duvall, who played the lead role in Tender Mercies, said of Barkin, "She brings a real credibility to that part, plus she was young and attractive and had a certain sense of edge, a danger to her that was good for that part." She also appeared in the 1983 rock and roll drama film Eddie and the Cruisers.

Barkin later appeared in several successful films, including the thrillers The Big Easy (1987), opposite Dennis Quaid and Sea of Love (1989), opposite Al Pacino. Barkin also appeared in off-Broadway plays, including a role as one of the roommates in Extremities, about an intended rape victim played by Susan Sarandon who turns the tables on her attacker. About her performance in the play Eden Court, The New York Times critic Frank Rich summarized: "If it were really possible to give the kiss of life to a corpse, the actress Ellen Barkin would be the one to do it. In Eden Court, the moribund play that has brought her to the Promenade Theater, Miss Barkin is tantalizingly alive from her bouncing blond ponytail to the long legs that gyrate wildly and involuntarily every time an Elvis Presley record plays on stage".

Barkin has also done work in made-for-television films such as Before Women Had Wings (1997), for which she won an Emmy as Outstanding Lead Actress in a Miniseries or Movie and The White River Kid (1999). She voiced the start of each Theme Time Radio Hour with host Bob Dylan on XM's Deep Tracks. In 2005, Barkin set up a film production company with her brother, George, along with her husband at the time and billionaire investor, Ronald Perelman.

Barkin appeared in her Broadway debut as Dr. Brookner in The Normal Heart, for which she won the 2011 Tony Award for Best Featured Actress in a Play. Barkin has received acclaim for her performance in Another Happy Day. IndieWire cited her turn as one of the best female performances of the year. In 2015, she starred as Dani Kirschenbloom, in the Showtime comedy-drama series Happyish.

From 2016 through 2019, Barkin starred as Janine "Smurf" Cody, the crime family's matriarch, in the TNT drama series Animal Kingdom. The series is based on the 2010 Australian film where Smurf was played by Jacki Weaver.

== Personal life ==
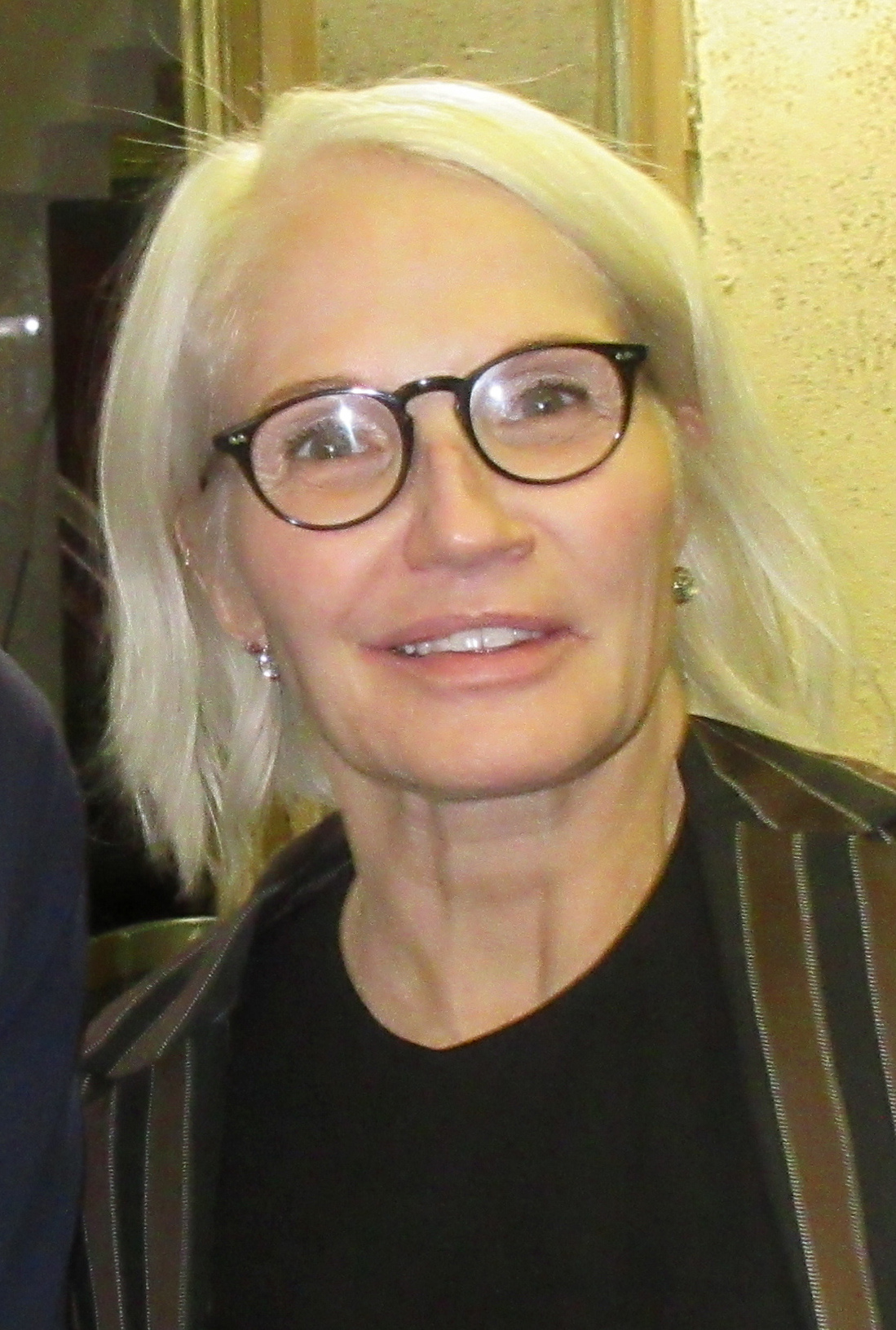
Barkin in 2018

Barkin is the mother of two children from her marriage to actor Gabriel Byrne. She and Byrne separated in 1993 and divorced in 1999, but remain close. Byrne attended Barkin's 2000 wedding to multibillionaire and businessman Ronald Perelman. Her second marriage ended in divorce in 2006.

In 1998, Barkin had a relationship with actor Johnny Depp with whom she worked on Fear and Loathing in Las Vegas.

In October 2006, "Magnificent Jewels from the Collection of Ellen Barkin" were sold for $20,369,200 at Christie's, New York, following her divorce from billionaire Ronald Perelman.

== Filmography ==
=== Film ===
Year	Title	Role	Notes
1978	Up in Smoke	Woman Playing Guitar	Uncredited
1982	Diner	Beth Schreiber	
1983	Tender Mercies	Sue Ann	
1983	Daniel	Phyllis Isaacson	
1983	Enormous Changes at the Last Minute	Virginia	
1983	Eddie and the Cruisers	Maggie Foley	
1984	Harry & Son	Kate Wilowski	
1984	The Adventures of Buckaroo Banzai Across the 8th Dimension	Penny Priddy	
1985	Terminal Choice	Mary O'Connor	
1986	Desert Bloom	Aunt Starr	Sant Jordi Award for Best Foreign Actress
1986	Down by Law	Laurette	
1987	The Big Easy	Anne Osborne	Sant Jordi Award for Best Foreign Actress
1987	Made in Heaven	Lucille	Uncredited
1987	Siesta	Claire	
1989	Johnny Handsome	"Sunny" Boyd	Nominated—Chicago Film Critics Association Award for Best Supporting Actress
1989	Sea of Love	Helen Cruger	Nominated—Chicago Film Critics Association Award for Best Actress
1991	Switch	Amanda Brooks	Nominated—American Comedy Award for Funniest Actress in a Motion Picture; Nominated—Golden Globe Award for Best Actress – Motion Picture Musical or Comedy
1992	Mac	Oona Goldfarb	
1992	Man Trouble	Joan Pruance	
1992	Into the West	Kathleen	
1993	This Boy's Life	Caroline Wolff Hansen	
1995	Bad Company	Margaret Wells	
1995	Wild Bill	Calamity Jane	
1996	The Fan	Jewel Stern	Blockbuster Entertainment Award for Favorite Supporting Actress – Adventure/Drama
1996	Mad Dog Time	Rita Everly	
1998	Fear and Loathing in Las Vegas	Waitress At North Star Cafe	
1999	Drop Dead Gorgeous	Annette Atkins	
1999	The White River Kid	Eva Nell La Fangory	
2000	Crime and Punishment in Suburbia	Maggie Skolnick	
2000	Mercy	Detective Cathy Palmer	
2001	Someone Like You	Diane Roberts	
2004	She Hate Me	Margo Chadwick	
2004	Palindromes	Joyce Victor	
2004	Ocean's Twelve	Abigail Sponder	Scenes deleted
2005	Trust the Man	Norah	
2007	Ocean's Thirteen	Abigail Sponder	
2009	Brooklyn's Finest	FBI Agent Smith	
2009	Happy Tears	Shelly	
2010	Twelve	Mrs. Brayson	
2010	The Chameleon	Kimberly Miller	
2010	Shit Year	Colleen West	Also executive producer
2010	Operation: Endgame	Empress	
2011	Another Happy Day	Lynn Hellman	Also producer Nominated — Women's Image Network Awards for Best Actress in a Feature Film
2013	Very Good Girls	Norma Berger	
2014	The Cobbler	Elaine Greenawalt	
2016	Hands of Stone	Stephanie Arcel	
2017	Active Adults	Lucy	
2021	Breaking News in Yuba County	Debbie	
2022	The Man from Toronto	The Handler	
2023	The Out-Laws	Lily McDermott	
TBA	White Lies	TBA	Post-production

=== Television ===
Year	Title	Role	Notes
1981	Kent State	Student	Television movie
1981	We're Fighting Back	Chris Capoletti	Television movie
1982	Parole	Donna	Television movie
1984	Terrible Joe Moran	Ronnie	Television movie
1986	Act of Vengeance	Annette Gilly	Television movie
1986	The Princess Who Had Never Laughed	Princess Henrietta	Television movie
1988	Clinton and Nadine	Nadine Powers	Television movie Nominated—CableACE Award for Best Actress in a Miniseries or a Movie
1997	Before Women Had Wings	Glory Marie Jackson	Television movie Primetime Emmy Award for Outstanding Lead Actress in a Miniseries or a Movie; Satellite Award for Best Supporting Actress – Series, Miniseries or Television Film; Nominated—Golden Globe Award for Best Actress – Miniseries or Television Film
2001	King of the Hill	Lenore (voice)	Episode: "Hank and the Great Glass Elevator"
2012	Modern Family	Mitzi Roth	Episode: "Send Out the Clowns"
2012–2013	The New Normal	Jane Forrest	Lead role; 22 episodes
2015	Happyish	Dani Kirschenbloom	Lead role; 9 episodes
2016–2019	Animal Kingdom	Janine "Smurf" Cody	Lead role; 46 episodes
2017	The Immortal Life of Henrietta Lacks	Sasha Walz	Television movie
2023	Poker Face	Kathleen Townsend	Episode: "Exit Stage Death"

=== Stage ===
Year	Title	Role	Notes	Ref.
1979	Shout Across the River	Christine	Marymount Manhattan Theatre	
1980	Killings on the Last Line	Starkey	American Place Theater	
1982	Extremities	Terry	Westside Theatre, Off-Broadway	
1985	Eden Court	Bonnie Duncan	Promenade Theatre	
2011	The Normal Heart	Dr. Emma Brookner	John Golden Theatre, Broadway	

== Awards and nominations ==
Year	Award	Category	Work	Result
1986	Sant Jordi Award	Best Foreign Actress	Desert Bloom	Won
1987	Sant Jordi Award	Best Foreign Actress	The Big Easy	Won
1988	CableACE Award	Best Actress in a Miniseries or a Movie	Clinton and Nadine	Nominated
1989	Chicago Film Critics Association Award	Best Supporting Actress	Johnny Handsome	Nominated
1989	Chicago Film Critics Association Award	Best Actress	Sea of Love	Nominated
1991	American Comedy Award	Funniest Actress in a Motion Picture	Switch	Nominated
1991	Golden Globe Award	Best Actress – Motion Picture Musical or Comedy	Switch	Nominated
1996	Blockbuster Entertainment Award	Favorite Supporting Actress – Adventure/Drama	The Fan	Won
1997	Primetime Emmy Award	Outstanding Lead Actress in a Miniseries or a Movie	Before Women Had Wings	Won
1997	Satellite Award	Best Supporting Actress – Series, Miniseries or Television Film	Before Women Had Wings	Won
1997	Golden Globe Award	Best Actress – Miniseries or Television Film	Before Women Had Wings	Nominated
2011	Women's Image Network Award	Best Actress in a Feature Film	Another Happy Day	Nominated
2011	Tony Award	Best Featured Actress in a Play	The Normal Heart	Won
2011	Outer Critics Circle Award	Special Achievement - Outstanding Debut	The Normal Heart	Won
2011	Theatre World Award	Outstanding Debut	The Normal Heart	Won
2011	Drama Desk Award	Ensemble Award	The Normal Heart	Honored
