= Shout Across the River (1978) =

Play by Stephen Poliakoff

Shout Across the River is a stage play, written by Stephen Poliakoff, which premiered at the RSC Donmar Warehouse (at that time called The Warehouse) in London in September 1978. It was directed by Bill Alexander. It featured Gwyneth Strong in the lead role of a troubled eighteen-year-old girl. The cast also included Lynn Farleigh, David Threlfall, Nigel Terry and Andrew Paul.

The play was produced at the Phoenix Theatre in New York City in January 1980. It was directed by Robert Woodruff with Ellen Barkin in the lead role with Barbara Eda-Young playing opposite.

The UK GCSE curriculum has included Shout Across the River as a suggested drama text.

== Storyline ==
Shout Across The River is centrally concerned with the troubled relationship between Mrs Forsythe and her wayward daughter Christine. Christine has just been suspended from school with the threat that, if she does not report regularly to her social worker, she is danger of being forcibly detained. However, Christine’s behaviour is uninhibited and so she fails completely to reform or report. The tension builds as Christine works to dominate her mother.

Set on the edge of London, this play is about a family clinging to each other for survival whilst the “shadow of unemployment and recession” hangs very strongly in the air. Christine captures the tone of how she perceives the world in exclaiming, "This is the worst time to be alive, everybody knows that!"
