= Gideon's Daughter =

2006 BBC dramatic television movie

- Written by: Stephen Poliakoff
- Directed by: Stephen Poliakoff
- Starring: Bill Nighy; Miranda Richardson; Emily Blunt; Tom Hardy
- Country of origin: United Kingdom
- Original language: English

Production
- Executive producers: Peter Fincham; Stephen Poliakoff; David M. Thompson; Kathryn Mitchell
- Producers: Nicholas Brown; Helen Flint
- Production locations: Edinburgh, Scotland; London, England
- Cinematography: Barry Ackroyd
- Editor: Clare Douglas
- Running time: 105 minutes
- Production companies: BBC America; BBC; Fremantle; Spotlight Films; Talkback Thames

Original release
- Network: BBC One
- Release: 26 February 2006

Related
- Friends and Crocodiles

Gideon's Daughter is the second of two linked BBC television dramas written and directed by Stephen Poliakoff.

Produced independently for the BBC by Talkback Thames and starring Bill Nighy, Miranda Richardson, and Emily Blunt, it aired in the UK on BBC One on 26 February 2006 and in the US on BBC America a month later. It was shown across Australia on ABC1 on 2 November 2008. The first of the dramas, Friends and Crocodiles, had been broadcast the previous month, with the character of Sneath (Robert Lindsay) appearing in both and acting as the narrator of Gideon's Daughter. The mini series was watched by 10.2 million viewers.

Nighy and Blunt won Golden Globe Awards for their performances. The production won a Peabody Award in April 2007.

== Cast ==
- Bill Nighy as Gideon
- Miranda Richardson as Stella
- Emily Blunt as Natasha
- Ronni Ancona as Barbara
- Robert Lindsay as Sneath
- Tom Hardy as Andrew
- Tom Goodman-Hill as Dent
- Joanna Page as Diane
- David Westhead as Bill

== Synopsis ==
William Sneath dictates his latest book to a hired secretary. Exploring themes of love, loss, parenthood, and the cult of celebrity, Gideon's Daughter is set against the backdrop of New Labour's rise to power, the death of Princess Diana, and the ill-advised development of the Millennium Dome.

Sneath's friend Gideon is a hotshot publicist and a widower, driven to the edge of a nervous breakdown by his daughter Natasha's emotional detachment from him. She resents him for repeatedly cheating on her mother, going so far as to call his mistress as her mother lay dying of cancer. To put distance between them, she at first plans to do volunteer work in South America or (her father's preferred choice) to study at the University of Edinburgh.

Stella is mourning the death of her young son, killed while riding his bike on public roads for the first time. Afraid of sleep, and desperate to escape her sense of bereavement, she works the night shift in a supermarket where she raises guinea pigs in the back. She meets Gideon when her ex-husband tries to accost one of Gideon's clients, a New Labour minister, about the government's lack of response to the unsafe traffic conditions that caused their son's death. Soon after the chance meeting, the two find themselves developing an emotional bond, brought together by a shared sense of grief and loss.

Stella convinces Gideon to try reaching out to Natasha before she leaves, but Natasha reacts angrily to Gideon's overtures and Stella's presence. Gideon's work suffers as he becomes even more detached from the disastrous Dome project, which winds up pushing it forward as his clients mistake his detachment for genius. Gideon eventually suffers a breakdown, but is helped through it by Natasha, who has warmed up to Stella and accepted that Gideon has changed. Sneath relates that during a huge party for his friends and clients, Gideon – as well as Natasha and Stella – essentially disappeared. However, Sneath caught a glimpse of Natasha on the streets of London many months later and she looked radiant, which he took as a sign that Gideon had mended his relationship with her and had stayed with Stella.

== Critical reception ==
Common Sense Media gave the film a 3/5 rating, praising the strong performances but criticizing the confusing structure and slow pacing. The Guardian gave the film a more positive review, calling it a "thoughtful and beautifully acted drama." The review praised the film's exploration of themes such as grief, loss, and redemption.
