= Close to the Enemy =

- Genre: Period drama
- Written by: Stephen Poliakoff
- Directed by: Stephen Poliakoff
- Starring: Jim Sturgess; Freddie Highmore; Charlotte Riley; Phoebe Fox; Alfred Molina; Ciara Charteris; Lindsay Duncan; Alfie Allen; Angela Bassett; August Diehl; Antje Traue; Lucy Ward; Sebastian Armesto; Julian Bleach; Charity Wakefield; Aleksandar Jovanovic; Robert Glenister
- Composer: Adrian Johnston
- Country of origin: United Kingdom
- Original language: English
- No. of series: 1
- No. of episodes: 7

Production
- Executive producers: Hilary Bevan Jones; Helen Flint; Colin Callender
- Producer: Helen Flint
- Running time: 58 minutes
- Production companies: Little Island Productions; All3Media International; Endor Productions

Original release
- Network: BBC Two
- Release: 10 November – 22 December 2016

Close to the Enemy is a British period drama television miniseries set in 1946 in London. It is written and directed by Stephen Poliakoff, starring Jim Sturgess, Freddie Highmore, Charlotte Riley, Phoebe Fox, Alfred Molina, Ciara Charteris, Lindsay Duncan, August Diehl, Alfie Allen, Angela Bassett, Antje Traue, Lucy Ward, Sebastian Armesto, Julian Bleach, Charity Wakefield, Aleksandar Jovanovic, and Robert Glenister. It premiered in the United Kingdom on BBC Two on 10 November 2016.

== Summary ==
Just after World War II ends, Dieter Koehler, a German engineer who specialised in jet aeroplane technology, is seized along with his young daughter Lotte by T-Force. They are taken to Great Britain and detained, where Captain Callum Ferguson is assigned the task of getting Koehler to co-operate with the British government. Ferguson is pressured to get results quickly, while Koehler resists his efforts, resentful of the treatment he and Lotte receive. Encountering various other characters in and around the Connington Hotel, Callum wrestles with the ethics of his mission as London society slowly rebuilds.

== Cast ==
- Jim Sturgess as Captain Callum Ferguson
- Freddie Highmore as Victor Ferguson
- Charlotte Riley as Rachel Lombard
- Phoebe Fox as Kathy Griffiths
- Alfred Molina as Harold Lindsay-Jones
- Ciara Charteris as Lucy Lindsay-Jones
- Lindsay Duncan as Frau Bellinghausen
- Alfie Allen as Ringwood
- Angela Bassett as Eva
- Robert Glenister as Brigadier Wainwright
- August Diehl as Dieter Koehler
- Antje Traue as Bergit Mentz
- Lucy Ward as Lotte Koehler
- Sebastian Armesto as Alex Lombard
- Julian Bleach as Geoffrey Slater
- Charity Wakefield as Julia
- Aleksandar Jovanovic as Horst Kleinow
- Andrew Price as Maître D'

== Episodes ==
No.	Title	Directed by	Written by	Original release date	UK viewers (millions)
1	"Episode 1"	Stephen Poliakoff	Stephen Poliakoff	10 November 2016	3.22
2	"Episode 2"	Stephen Poliakoff	Stephen Poliakoff	17 November 2016	2.40
3	"Episode 3"	Stephen Poliakoff	Stephen Poliakoff	24 November 2016	2.25
4	"Episode 4"	Stephen Poliakoff	Stephen Poliakoff	1 December 2016	2.11
5	"Episode 5"	Stephen Poliakoff	Stephen Poliakoff	8 December 2016	2.28
6	"Episode 6"	Stephen Poliakoff	Stephen Poliakoff	15 December 2016	2.12
7	"Episode 7"	Stephen Poliakoff	Stephen Poliakoff	22 December 2016	2.14

== Production ==
The Stephen Poliakoff-created seven-part series was announced by BBC Two in March 2015, along with an all-star cast consisting of Jim Sturgess, Freddie Highmore, Charlotte Riley, Phoebe Fox, Alfred Molina, Lindsay Duncan, Robert Glenister, August Diehl, Antje Traue, Angela Bassett and Alfie Allen. The series was acquired for the United States by Starz in September 2015.

Principal photography began in Liverpool in March 2015 with Martins Bank Building, Croxteth Hall, the Adelphi Hotel being amongst some of the locations utilised. Filming also took place at the ruins of Witley Court, Worcestershire, the University of Salford, Salford Museum and Art Gallery, Manchester Town Hall, Capesthorne Hall, London and Kent at The Historic Dockyard Chatham.

An accompanying interview with the writer, titled Know Your Enemy - Stephen Poliakoff in Conversation, was broadcast on 1 December 2016.
