= Nobby Clark (photographer) =

English photographer

- Occupation: Photographer
- Years active: 1968–present
- Spouse: Lynne Miller

Nobby Clark is an English photographer of theatre, opera, dance and live classical and contemporary music performance.

== Background ==
Clark has worked for many UK broadsheets including The Guardian, The Observer, The Times and The Sunday Times. He has also been commissioned by all the major English theatre, ballet and opera companies including both the Royal Opera, London and the Royal Ballet, as well as extensively by the Royal National Theatre, Royal Shakespeare Company and the Theatre Royal Haymarket. He has been the in house photographer for the Northern Broadsides Theatre Company since its first production of Richard III in 1992.

He has worked with directors such as Sir Richard Eyre, Sir Trevor Nunn, Sir Peter Hall, Bill Bryden, John Dexter, Sir Alan Ayckbourn, and John Schlesinger. He has also worked with several comedians on their live shows including Dave Allen, Rik Mayall, Billy Connolly, and Ben Elton and, for Noel Gay Television. In 2005 he was production photographer for the 7th series of cult UK television comedy Red Dwarf.

== Recent career ==
He worked with Sir Peter Hall on the 2009 season of plays at the Theatre Royal, Bath having been production photographer for all previous seasons. In 2007 he presented an exhibition of black and white photographs at the Royal National Theatre called 'London Blues' which included a book and a short black and white film of the same title, shot around London and with an original jazz score by John Harle and Steve Lodder. He took this exhibition to New York in September 2008. The same year he also showed an exhibition of his photographs of the Rolling Stones at Earls Court in 1976 at the GX Gallery in Camberwell, London. 'Starf*cker', a book of the photographs, was published by Oberon Books in the same year. It was reprinted in 2008.

He continues to photograph rehearsal and backstage images for many notable theatre productions including 2009's 'A Midsummer Night's Dream' starring Dame Judi Dench as Titania, and directed by Sir Peter Hall. In 2026 he photographed the Orange Tree Theatre production of August Strindberg's 'Dance of Death'.

== Exhibitions ==
From 1994 till 1998 'Nobby Clark's Theatre' appeared at the Victoria and Albert Theatre Museum in Covent Garden and included photographs from 'Billy Connolly's World Tour of Australia' as well as a number of images from his main body of work in theatre and newspapers including behind the scenes images of Vanessa Redgrave, Plácido Domingo, Al Pacino, Helen Mirren, Bruce Springsteen, Barry Humphries and Steven Berkoff. The exhibition also toured to the Central School of Speech and Drama in Kings Cross and the BAC Gallery.

Other exhibitions include 'Photo Call', a collection of his work with the Observer newspaper, which toured the UK and then went to both Hyde Park in Sydney and the Festival of Perth in Australia. 2007 saw an exhibition of 'London Blues' – 101 photographs of London taken by Clark over a 40-year period – displayed at the National Theatre in London.

Nobby is a member of Chelsea Arts Club and an exhibition of his photographs, especially featuring his Rolling Stones photographs, was held at the Club in 2010.

In 2012 the Northern Broadsides opened an exhibit of Nobby's work to celebrate 20 years of the theatre company, of which he was production photographer since its beginnings in 1992. 'Northern Broadsides – 20 years- photography by Nobby Clark' ran in Dean Clough's Crossley gallery from 26 May till 16 September.

== Selected theatrical production photography ==
=== West End ===
- 'On the Waterfront' starring and directed by Steven Berkoff, 2009
- 'The Observer' with Anna Chancellor and directed by Richard Eyre, 2009
- 'Epitaph for George Dillon' with Joe Fiennes and directed by Peter Gill, 2005
- 'Betrayal' with Aden Gillett and directed by Sir Peter Hall, 2003
- 'Tantalus' directed by Peter Hall, Salford, 2001
- 'Lenny' with Eddie Izzard and directed by Peter Hall, 1999
- 'M. Butterfly' with Anthony Hopkins, 1989
- 'A View from the Bridge' with Michael Gambon and directed by Alan Ayckbourn, NT, 1987
- 'Romeo and Juliet' with Ian McKellen and directed by Trevor Nunn, RSC, 1976

=== Broadway ===
- 'Cyrano de Bergerac' with Derek Jacobi, RSC, 1984
- 'Much Ado About Nothing' with Derek Jacobi, RSC, 1984
- 'All's Well that Ends Well' directed by Trevor Nunn, RSC, 1983
- 'American Buffalo' with Al Pacino, 1983

=== Other productions ===
- 'A Midsummer Night's Dream' with Judi Dench and directed by Peter Hall, Kingston London, 2010
- 'The Stripper' The Queens Theatre, Hornchurch, UK 2009
- 'Bouncers' The Queens theatre, Hornchurch, UK 2006
- 'John Harle's Berlin Nights' concert with Albert Finney, Kate Westbrook, Phil Minton and the London Symphony Orchestra, 1989

He has also worked on many musicals including 'Cats' and 'Starlight Express' by Andrew Lloyd Webber, 'Thoroughly Modern Millie', the Cameron Mackintosh production of 'Oliver!' and 'Rent' on Broadway.

=== TV and film stills photography ===
- 'Red Dwarf' with Craig Charles, 2005
- 'Oliver Twist' adapted by Diplomat Films, 1999
- 'Jake's Progress' with Julie Walters and Robert Lindsay, adapted by Alan Bleasdale, 1995
- 'The Chain' with Nigel Hawthorne and Anna Massey, 1984

== The Director ==
His directing credits include a short film funded by the British Film Institute called 'Comrade Lady'Royal Ballet principal dancer Marguerite Porter and with music by John Harle, which was shown at the Cannes Film Festival in 1987. He also directed Billy Connolly's World Tour of Australia and three of the films that were records of his live performances.
