= Stephen Liddle =

British chemistry professor (born 1974)

Stephen T. Liddle
- Born: Sunderland, UK
- Education: Newcastle University
- Scientific career
- Fields: Chemistry
- Workplaces: University of Manchester; University of Nottingham; University of Edinburgh; Newcastle University
- Doctoral advisor: W. Clegg
- Website: personalpages.manchester.ac.uk/staff/steve.liddle/

Stephen T. Liddle FRSC FRSE MAE is a British professor of inorganic chemistry at the University of Manchester. He has been Head of Inorganic Chemistry and Co-Director of the Centre for Radiochemistry Research at the University of Manchester since 2015, and Director of the National Nuclear User Facility at the Centre for Radiochemistry Research since 2019. His research has contributed significantly to the field of f-element chemistry.

== Early life and education ==
Liddle was born near Sunderland, in the North East of England, in 1974. In 1997 he graduated with a BSc(Hons) in chemistry with applied chemistry from Newcastle University. His degree included a year working as a research scientist for ICI Performance Chemicals at Wilton, Teesside. Alongside a stint in the Territorial Army, Liddle continued his studies at the university and received his PhD in 2000. His PhD supervisor was Professor W. Clegg.

== Career and research ==
After postdoctoral fellowships with P. J. Bailey at the University of Edinburgh, Keith Izod at Newcastle University as the Wilfred Hall Research Fellow, and Polly Arnold at the University of Nottingham, Liddle began his independent academic career at the University of Nottingham with a Royal Society University Research Fellowship (2007–2015) held with a proleptic Lectureship. He was promoted to Associate Professor and Reader in 2010 and Professor of Inorganic Chemistry in 2013.

He moved to the University of Manchester in 2015 as Head of Inorganic Chemistry and Co-Director of the Centre for Radiochemistry Research. He is Director of the National Nuclear User Facility at the Centre for Radiochemistry Research since 2019, and he held an Engineering and Physical Sciences Research Council Established Career Fellowship (2015–2021).

He was Chairman of COST Action CM1006, a 22-country research network of over 120 research groups in f-block chemistry (2011–2015), is an advisor to the Commonwealth Scholarship Commission (2013–), and was an elected category 3 member of Senate, the University of Manchester (2016–2019).

Liddle's research is focused on synthetic inorganic chemistry, particularly making early transition metal, lanthanide, and actinide complexes to explore their structure, bonding, reactivity, and magnetism. In 2011 he reported a single-molecule magnet based on depleted uranium. In 2012 his research group was the first to synthesize a molecular terminal uranium(V) nitride. In 2013 he reported the isolation of a terminal uranium(VI) nitride akin to examples previously restricted to cryogenic matrix isolation experiments, and that formed the basis from which to report the electronic structure of uranium nitrides including quantifying the covalence of the uranium-nitrogen triple bond by using ^{15}N NMR spectroscopy. In 2013, his research group disclosed the first f-element cyclobutadienyl complexes. Between 2014-2025 he reported a range of M=EH bonds (M = Th, U; E = N, P, As, and Sb) along with phosphide, arsenido, and stibido derivatives. In 2019 his research group isolated a uranium(V)-dinitrogen complex. In 2021, Liddle reported a tri-thorium cluster featuring two-electron σ-aromatic actinide metal-metal bonding, and in follow-up work reported one-electron analogues that exhibit exalted diamagnetism and were found to be open-shell aromatic superatoms. Before the synthesis of those metal-metal complexes, examples of actinide-actinide bonding had been restricted to matrix isolation experiments and fullerene-encapsulated species. In 2022, he reported a terminal neptunium(V)-mono(oxo) complex. Before the synthesis of this complex all transuranium-ligand multiple bond complexes required two or more metal-ligand multiple bonds to be stable. Following on from his reports of U=C double bonds over uranium oxidation states +3 to +6, in 2022 and 2024 he reported neptunium- and plutonium- diphosphonioalkylidenes and -N -heterocyclic carbenes. In 2018 he introduced titanium as a catalytically active metal in molecular dinitrogen to ammonia catalysis chemistry, and in 2025, in collaboration with the Mazzanti group at École Polytechnique Fédérale de Lausanne, he reported catalytic conversion of side-on bound dinitrogen to ammonia at uranium. He has also reported investigations on the basic properties of actinides, including homologation of carbon monoxide, showing that the inverse-trans-influence is general, reversible oxidative addition/reductive elimination at uranium, demonstrating the structure-directing role of f-orbital overlap-driven covalency, establishing pushing-from-below for thorium, introducing Frustrated Lewis Pair chemistry to the actinides, explaining anomalous magnetism of uranium(IV), inverting the fundamental disproportionation chemistry of uranium, and using actinides to stabilise unusual main group species.

== Honours and awards ==
Liddle was elected Fellow of the Royal Society of Chemistry (FRSC) in 2011, to the Fellowship of the Royal Society of Edinburgh (FRSE), Scotland's national academy of science and letters, in 2022, and Member of Academia Europaea (MAE) in 2025. In 2025, Liddle became Member of the European Academy of Sciences and Arts, and a Member of the European Academy of Science in 2026.

He was Vice President to the Executive Committee of the European Rare Earth and Actinide Society (ERES, 2012–2023), President Elect (2023-2026) and President (2026-), with the latter involving, as Founding Trustee, re-establishing ERES as a UK Charity.

He was one of the Periodic Videos team awarded the IChemE Petronas Team Award for Excellence in Education and Training (2008).

He is a recipient of the RSC Sir Edward Frankland Fellowship (2011), the RSC Radiochemistry Group Bill Newton Award in 2011, the RSC Corday-Morgan Prize in 2015, the RSC Tilden Prize in 2020, and a Royal Society of Chemistry Dalton Division Horizon Team Prize in 2021.

He was a recipient of a Rising Star Award at the 41st International Conference on Coordination Chemistry in 2014.

He was awarded an Alexander von Humboldt Foundation Friedrich Wilhelm Bessel Research award in 2019.

He was awarded the GDCh Alexander Todd - Hans Krebs Lectureship in 2023.

He was awarded the Terrae Rarae Award of the Tage Der Seltenen Erden in 2025.

He was awarded a European Research Council (ERC) Starter Grant in 2009 and Consolidator Grant in 2014.

He has been a visiting professor at the University of Regensburg in Germany and the École Polytechnique Fédérale de Lausanne in Switzerland.

== Popular science ==
Liddle is known for his work on The Periodic Table of Videos, a series of videos from the University of Nottingham presented on YouTube, which feature educational vignettes on the periodic table.

He is executive producer for Chemistry at Manchester Explains Research Advances (CAMERA), a series of videos from the University of Manchester presented on YouTube, which feature videos explaining chemistry research papers published from the University of Manchester.

He is a National Co-ordinating Centre for Public Engagement Ambassador (2013–).
