= Loose Connections =

- Irish DVD cover
- Directed by: Richard Eyre
- Written by: Maggie Brooks
- Produced by: Simon Perry
- Starring: Stephen Rea; Lindsay Duncan
- Cinematography: Clive Tickner
- Edited by: David Martin
- Music by: Dominic Muldowney
- Production companies: Virgin Films; Greenpoint Films; National Film Finance Corporation; Umbrella
- Distributed by: 20th Century Fox
- Release date: 4 December 1983 (London Film Festival)
- Running time: 95 minutes
- Country: United Kingdom
- Language: English
- Budget: £800,000

Loose Connections is a 1983 British film starring Stephen Rea.

== Plot ==
Sally, a feminist, plans to travel through Europe to a convention in Munich, Germany and advertises for a co-driver. She wants a woman who speaks German but ends up hiring Harry, a male chauvinist from Liverpool, who is the only one to apply.

== Cast ==
- Stephen Rea as Harry
- Lindsay Duncan as Sally
- Jan Niklas as Axel
- Carole Harrison as Kaya
- Gary Olsen as Kevin
- Frances Low as Larie
- Ken Jones

== Production ==
The film was the first produced script from Maggie Brooks, a TV playwright.

Three quarters of the budget came from the National Film Finance Corporation with the rest coming from Virgin Films, their first film production.

== Release ==
Loose Connection was the closing film at the 1983 London Film Festival.

The film was not released in the United States until 1988. Vincent Canby in The New York Times said "Nothing happens in Loose Connections that isn't announced ahead of time, but the movie is very decently acted by Mr. Rea and especially by Miss Duncan... The film... is bright, articulate, gentle and completely unsurprising."

Filmink argued "everyone involved was very talented but the movie didn't quite click."

== Notes ==
- Forbes, Jill (Autumn 1983). "Crossover: McEwan and Eyre". Sight and Sound. pp. 232–238.
