= Hidden City (film) =

- Theatrical release poster
- Directed by: Stephen Poliakoff
- Written by: Stephen Poliakoff
- Starring: Charles Dance; Cassie Stuart; Bill Paterson
- Edited by: Peter Coulson
- Music by: Michael Storey
- Production company: Channel Four Films
- Distributed by: The Other Cinema
- Release date: 1987
- Running time: 108 minutes
- Country: United Kingdom
- Language: English
- Budget: £1 million

Hidden City is a 1987 British political thriller drama film written and directed by Stephen Poliakoff in his directorial debut. It stars Charles Dance, Cassie Stuart, Richard E. Grant and Bill Paterson. The film had a limited theatrical release before it was shown in Channel 4's Film on Four strand on 9 May 1989 (postponed from 9 March 1989).

== Plot ==
Infuriated by receiving the wrong piece of film, statistician James Richards arranges for the researcher who made the mistake, Sharon Newton, to be sacked. When she realises that he is responsible, Sharon contacts James and demands his help. She has obtained a mysterious piece of film which, while superficially a collection of street scenes, seems to show the abduction of a woman. The film abruptly cuts off, instructing the viewer to see The Hedgerows of England. As this film has been registered classified by the Ministry of Defence, Sharon, obsessed by the identity of the woman, needs James, with his official credentials, to help her find it.

James tracks down the location of the film, but a visit to an old tram depot and an archive beneath Oxford Street proves frustrating, as the film has now been moved. He and Sharon chase it to a landfill site, where they notice a police presence, and then to the incinerator at Edmonton, where they manage to rescue it before it is burned. But upon viewing the film, they find that it is very poor quality, revealing only a dark image of a woman in front of some kind of tribunal. A card at the end tells them that the next film to look for is called Hop-Picking in Kent. James is not entirely unhappy to find his comfortable life disrupted by the search for the film, and wakes up, after a drunken evening spent at a video duplication service, at Sharon's house, where he discovers that she has a young daughter. Needing to go out to work, she leaves her daughter with James.

Taking the baby out to meet his ex-wife, James is cornered by two officials, who beat him up and demand to know the whereabouts of something he has found. Shaken, he goes to see his City friend Anthony, who advises him to go home and forget about it. But Anthony also drops a hint that he too has been questioned, and James realises that he is in serious danger. Returning to his house, he finds it has been searched and realises that the officials want some medical records which he idly picked up from the landfill site. After an unexpected encounter with them, James manages to escape and is reunited with a distressed Sharon, who has been worried about her daughter.

Meanwhile, a friend of Sharon's does some illicit searching for her in the archives and discovers the film Hop-Picking In Kent. Within the bland information film is a full version of the mysterious film, featuring a different woman along with a man. Some kind of emergency has occurred and left the participants dead. Moving forward in time, the film documents the birth of an abruptly aborted government project named Magnificat. The woman from the original film then reappears, sitting in a location which James recognises: an official building which has re-opened as a café. The film ends with the woman reunited with a horribly scarred man and confronting the cameraman, asking why he is filming. James suggests that this was the result of an accident with nuclear power which has been hushed up and that the café was once a secure convalescent unit. He also wonders why the film was made in the first place. James and Sharon decide to keep the film secret and he throws the offending medical records into a bin. Meanwhile, somewhere in London, a cleaner has her break in an isolated room where the remnants of Project Magnificat are still stored. The film is actually incinerated but before that happens, it is transferred to tape. During that process some of the scenes are very dark. The final scene with the cleaner is the woman who was cleaning the café when Richard and Sharon come in towards the end of the movie. So the boxes are still being stored in the building where the convalescing took place.

== Cast ==
- Charles Dance as James Richards
- Cassie Stuart as Sharon Newton
- Richard E. Grant as Anthony
- Bill Paterson as Brewster
- Alex Norton as Hillcombe
- Gerard Horan as Young Man in Tunnel
- Saul Jephcott as Curtis
- Chris Jury as Man at Incinerator
- Robin Soans as Man in Tram Tunnel
- Michelle Fairley as Cleaner
- Barbara Young as Woman in Film Disposal Office
