= David Gayle =

David Gayle MBE is a former dancer with The Royal Ballet and founder of the Yorkshire Ballet Seminars and first co-ordinator of the Royal Ballet Summer School.

== Early career ==
David Gayle was born and brought up in Ilkley, West Yorkshire, and trained under Mrs Margaret Allenby-Jaffé in Skipton, North Yorkshire. He was a dancer with The Royal Ballet, performing alongside the likes of Rudolf Nureyev and Dame Margot Fonteyn. He was the first boy to be taken on to the teacher training course at the Royal Ballet School.

== Yorkshire Ballet Seminars ==
Gayle founded the Yorkshire Ballet Seminars to give young people the chance to learn ballet without having to go to London. The first residential summer ballet course was officially opened at Ilkley College on 4 August 1975 by Dame Ninette de Valois, founder of the Royal Ballet and the Royal Ballet School. The first master class was then taught by Dame Alicia Markova. "Our reputation spread nd students came from all over the world," Gayle said in an interview in 2009. "So many of the students went on to be professional dancers: in ballet companies, in musicals and in contemporary dance." The Yorkshire Ballet Seminars left Ilkley when the college closed in 1999 and are now held at York St John University in York.

Following the success of the Yorkshire Ballet Seminars, prima ballerina Merle Park invited Gayle to set up similar seminars in London as the Royal Ballet Summer School in 1987.

Gayle retired from the Yorkshire Ballet Seminars in 2005, handing over the directorship to Marguerite Porter, a former senior principal ballerina and guest artist with the Royal Ballet. Gayle was made an MBE in 1991.
