= Aristo (play) =

Aristo is a 2008 play by American born playwright Martin Sherman, based on material in the book Nemesis by Peter Evans about the life of Aristotle Onassis after he met Jackie Kennedy. It premiered at the Minerva Theatre, Chichester (11 September – 11 October 2008), was directed by Nancy Meckler and starred Robert Lindsay as Onassis.

== Reviews ==
The play was poorly received by critics and did not transfer to the West End even though it had sold out in Chichester. However, critics agreed that Robert Lindsay's performance eclipsed the play.

== Cast ==
- Robert Lindsay - Onassis
- Elizabeth McGovern - Jacqueline
- June Watson - Eleni
- Robin Soans - Costa
- Denise Black - Dimitra
- Julius D'Silva - Theo
- John Hodgkinson - Yanni
- Diana Quick - Maria
- Joe Marsh - Alexander
- Ben Grove - Musician
- Graeme Taylor - Musician
- Andrew Elias - Waiter
- Nick Howard-Brown - Waiter
