= Friends and Crocodiles =

2006 British television film

- Genre: Drama
- Written by: Stephen Poliakoff
- Directed by: Stephen Poliakoff
- Starring: Damian Lewis; Jodhi May; Robert Lindsay
- Country of origin: United Kingdom
- Original language: English

Production
- Editor: Clare Douglas
- Running time: 109 mins

Original release
- Network: BBC One
- Release: 15 January 2006

Related
- Gideon's Daughter

Friends and Crocodiles is a one-off British television drama production, written and directed by Stephen Poliakoff and first broadcast on BBC One on 15 January 2006.

== Overview ==
The film charts the shifting power between a boss and his secretary as their careers rise and fall in the rapidly changing workplace of 1980s and 1990s Britain. Friends and Crocodiles stars Damian Lewis, Jodhi May and Robert Lindsay with an ensemble cast that includes Patrick Malahide, Tim Plester and Eddie Marsan.

Damian Lewis plays Paul Reynolds, a Gatsby-like figure and inspirational entrepreneur. He is a host of fabulous parties, a "collector" of interesting people, a visionary with dreams of new urban landscapes, and keeper of a pet crocodile. Jodhi May plays Lizzie Thomas, who in 1981 is persuaded by Paul to become his secretary and bring some order to his creative chaos. Once at Paul's magnificent house, Lizzie's world expands as she meets artists, historians and politicians.

The drama was loosely linked to a second Poliakoff piece, Gideon's Daughter, broadcast the following month. Although the links were more thematic than narrative, the character of William Sneath (Lindsay) reappeared in Gideon's Daughter, acting as the narrator.

== Cast ==
Role	Cast
Paul Reynolds	Damian Lewis
Lizzie Thomas	Jodhi May
Christine	Sophie Hunter
Angela	Isabel Brook
Simone	Ruth Millar
Carol	Olivia Poulet
William Sneath	Robert Lindsay
Francis Butterworth	Eddie Marsan
Anders	Patrick Malahide
Albert Brother (Jnr)	Tim Plester
Delivery Boy	David John Daniels

== Trivia ==
The location of the final scene around the fire is Weavers Fields in Bethnal Green.
