= Marguerite Porter =

English ballet dancer

Marguerite Porter MBE (born 30 November 1948) is an English former principal ballet dancer, turned actress and choreographer.

== Biography ==
Born in Doncaster, Porter trained in Yorkshire and at the Royal Ballet School in London, where she was taught by Dame Ninette De Valois.

After two years training she joined The Royal Ballet, where she is now a Governor, becoming Senior Principal Ballerina in 1978. In a 20-year association, she danced all the major roles, including Princess Aurora in The Sleeping Beauty, Odette/Odile in Swan Lake alongside Rudolf Nureyev, Juliet in Romeo and Juliet, Ophelia in Hamlet, and the title role in productions of Manon, Giselle, Daphnis and Chloe among others. After leaving the Royal Ballet, she became a guest artiste for a further three years, during which time she published be autobiography Ballerina, A Dancer’s Life. She has made numerous appearances with English National Ballet.

Porter made her Broadway debut as the Queen in Matthew Bourne's production of Swan Lake. She also made a video based on ballet called Balletcise. Her television and films roles have included The Magic of the Dance with Margot Fonteyn, and the British Institute film Comrade Lady, directed by Nobby Clark and choreographed by David Bintley. She has since become an accomplished choreographer, including productions of The Garden of Eros for London City Ballet and Dancing at Lughnasa.

Porter teaches at the Royal Ballet School, where in 2008 she taught Marianela Núñez the steps of The Dying Swan as Michel Fokine choreographed for Anna Pavlova in 1907. She has also taught at the Ballet Rambert, and as a guest teacher at the Hong Kong Ballet.

Porter is a Director of the Yorkshire Ballet Seminars (taking over from the retiring David Gayle), and a governor of the Royal Ballet Company, Birmingham Royal Ballet and the Royal Ballet School.

She was appointed Member of the Order of the British Empire (MBE) in the 2015 New Year Honours for services to ballet.

== Family ==
Porter was married to the actor Nicky Henson until his death in December 2019. The couple have one son, Keaton.
