= Shooting the Past =

- Genre: Drama
- Written by: Stephen Poliakoff
- Directed by: Stephen Poliakoff
- Starring: Timothy Spall; Lindsay Duncan; Liam Cunningham
- Composer: Adrian Johnston
- Country of origin: United Kingdom
- Original language: English
- No. of seasons: 1
- No. of episodes: 3

Production
- Producer: John Chapman
- Production company: TalkBack Productions for BBC

Original release
- Network: BBC Two
- Release: 10 January – 24 January 1999

Shooting the Past is a television drama by Stephen Poliakoff, produced by TalkBack Productions for BBC Two and first shown in 1999. It was TalkBack's first drama production, the company being mainly known for its television comedy work.

Focused around a photo library threatened by closure, and the lives of its eccentric staff, it featured Timothy Spall and Lindsay Duncan, was awarded Best Drama Series at the Royal Television Society Awards of the same year and received other international awards, including the Prix Italia.

== Plot ==
Shooting the Past delves into a world separate from modern life and demonstrates that the preservation of the past in order to tell extraordinary stories of the lives of ordinary people can be powerful and revealing. The Fallon Photo Library is a collection of photographs kept in a Victorian mansion/factory. There are few staff members and the members are shy eccentrics led by manager Marilyn Truman (Duncan) and head librarian Oswald Bates (Spall). An American company buys the building, planning to remodel and modernise the building to turn it into a business school.

The company president, Christopher Anderson (Liam Cunningham), had informed Oswald by fax months earlier that he was coming and to have the building empty and ready but Oswald fails to pass on the news, planning a "strike" of sorts. On their arrival, having expected the library of ten million photographs to have been disposed of and the building emptied, Anderson tells the staff that the majority of the collection must be destroyed if they cannot sell it. The staff members believe that the collection must be kept in its entirety, not broken up or sold to different buyers.

To prove the value of their library, the group presents Anderson with intriguing stories put together by researching photos from all over the collection. The research was largely by Oswald and presented by Marilyn, who emphasizes that these photos came from all over the collection and that Oswald spent months studying details to piece the stories together. Against orders from his superiors, Anderson gives them time to find a buyer. Due to the size of the collection, there is little interest. Marilyn has to learn to "sell" herself and the collection and manages to make a successful pitch to an advertising company but as most of the collection is in black and white the potential sale falls through. Having alienated Anderson to the point that he's been banned from the building, Oswald attempts suicide, leaving notes on a final story. Marilyn attempts to think as Oswald would and lays out the pictures – telling the story of Anderson's grandmother. Finally convinced that the collection should be saved and kept whole, Anderson finds a buyer in America – another photo collection – who will accept all ten million pictures.

== Production ==
The photos represented in the series as belonging to the "Fallon Photo Library" are in fact taken from the holdings of Britain's largest picture library, the Hulton Picture Collection, which originated as the photographic archive of Picture Post magazine (1938–57). At least two of Bert Hardy's photos, for example, appear in the series, including his view of a panda "taking a picture" of Hardy's son Michael. The Hulton Picture Collection was acquired by Getty Images in 1996. The two stories which staff members present to Mr. Anderson are fictional accounts created for this film. According to Poliakoff on the commentary track of the DVD, the Jewish girl, Lily Katzmann, was played by Emma Sackville. Hettie, the Irish musician and Anderson's grandmother, was played by a model whom Poliakoff did not name.

== Cast ==
- Marilyn Truman – Lindsay Duncan
- Oswald Bates – Timothy Spall
- Christopher Anderson – Liam Cunningham
- Veronica – Billie Whitelaw
- Spig – Emilia Fox
- Nick – Blake Ritson
- Garnett – Arj Barker
- Styeman – Andy Serkis
