= Multitone Electronics =

British company

- Company type: Subsidiary
- Founded: 9 May 1931; 95 years ago in London
- Founder: Joseph Poliakoff
- Headquarters: Basingstoke, United Kingdom
- Owner: Champion Technology Holdings (64.9%)
- Parent: Champion Technology Holdings
- Website: www.multitone.com
- Footnotes / references source

Multitone Electronics plc is a British company, founded in 1931. Initially a manufacturer of hearing aids, before becoming a pioneer in the development of pagers (bleepers). Multitone now makes wireless voice and messaging systems.

Multitone Electronics is a British company, founded by Joseph Poliakoff in London in 1931, with a £500 loan from Henry Myer, his lawyer. Joseph Poliakoff was a Russian-born telephone and sound engineer and inventor. The first offices were in White Lion Street, Angel Islington, London.

Notable customers for the company's hearing aids included Winston Churchill.

Joseph Poliakoff's son, Alexander Poliakoff (1910–1996), a Russian-born British electronics engineer, inventor and businessman, was the chairman of Multitone Electronics for over 40 years. He retired in 1977 and sold the company to Hong Kong-based Champion Technology. Multitone Electronics is a subsidiary of Hong Kong listed company Champion Technology Holdings since 1993.
