= Joseph Poliakoff =

Russian-born British engineer (1873–1959)

- Иосиф Поляков
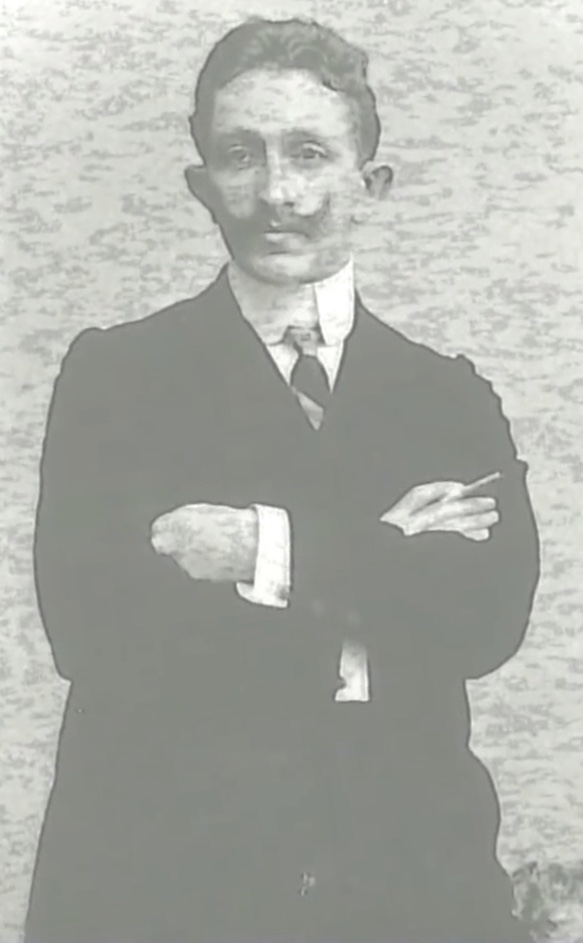
- Born: Iosif Lazarevich Polyakov; 24 April 1873; Kremenchuk, Poltava Governorate, Russian Empire
- Died: 24 November 1959 (aged 86); London, England
- Occupations: Telephone and sound Engineer and Inventor
- Known for: Founder of Multitone Electronics
- Spouse: Flora Shabbat
- Children: Alexander Poliakoff
- Relatives: Sir Martyn Poliakoff (grandson); Stephen Poliakoff (grandson)

Joseph Lazarevich Poliakoff (Russian: Ио́сиф Ла́заревич Поляко́в; 24 April 1873 – 24 November 1959) was a Russian-born British telephone and sound engineer and inventor, particularly of hearing aids.

Poliakoff was a Russian Jew who experienced first-hand the communist revolution in Russia from the family's Moscow flat across from the Kremlin. Near starvation after the revolution, he was given a government job as a district telephone inspector from an admiring commissar and he helped build Moscow's first automatic telephone exchange. He then fled with his family from the Soviet Union to the UK in 1924.

Poliakoff was a renowned inventor of electrical devices whose many inventions included a selenium photograph telephony shutter in 1899 (US patent 700,083, 13 May 1902), which, along with electrical sound amplification, allowed for synchronized audio on film, the radio volume control, a magnetic induction loop that allowed hearing-impaired people to hear in auditoriums or theatres, and the paging beeper.

He also founded the Multitone Electric Company of London, England in 1931 that produced hearing aid devices, with their most prestigious client being Winston Churchill. Poliakoff was managing director until 1938.

He married Flora Shabbat, a granddaughter of a textile millionaire. His son, Alexander Poliakoff (1910–1996) was chairman of Multitone Electronics for over 40 years, and his grandsons are the chemist Sir Martyn Poliakoff and the dramatist/director Stephen Poliakoff.
