= Stephen Poliakoff =

British playwright and director

Stephen Poliakoff CBE, FRSL
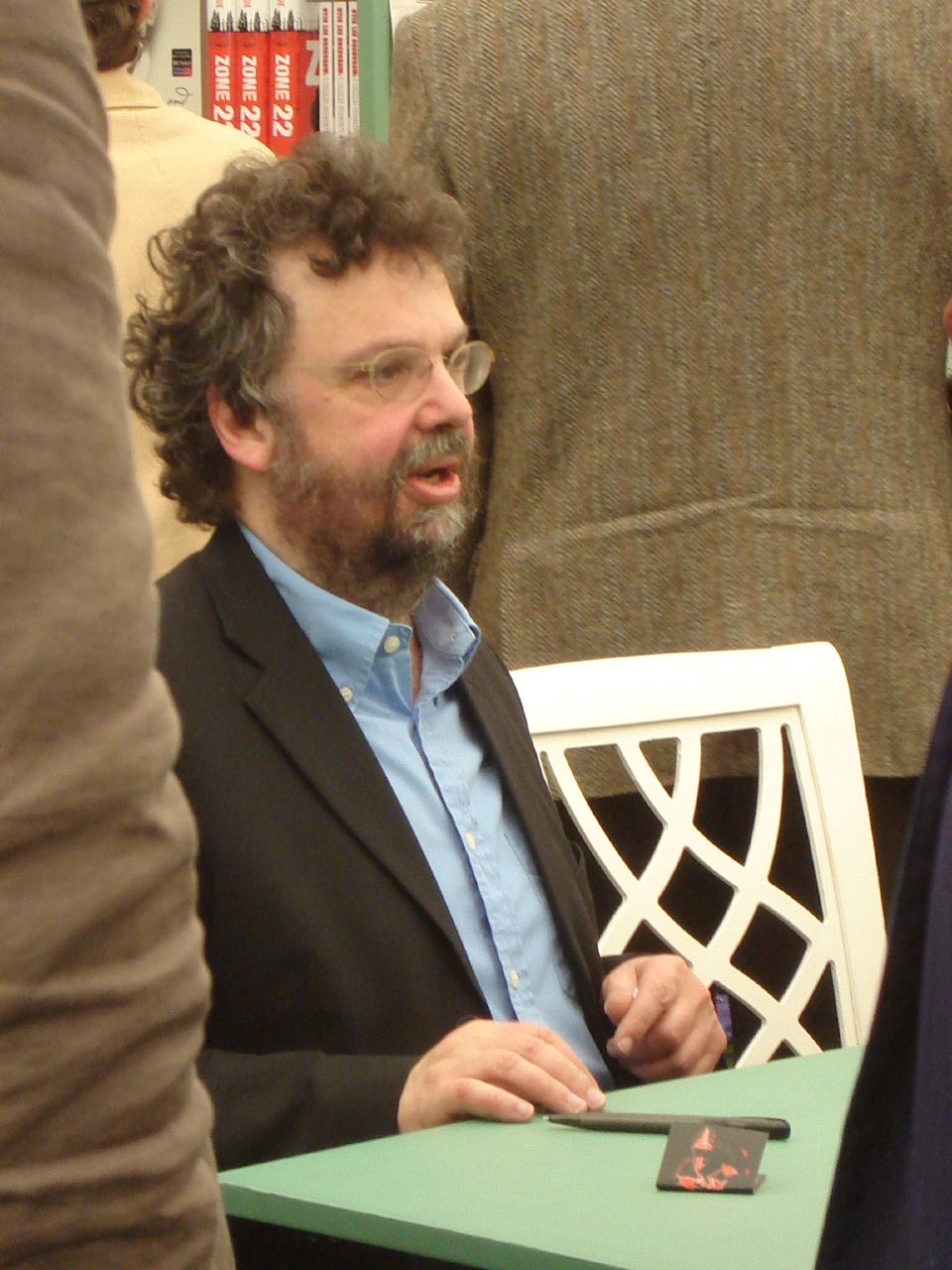
- Stephen Poliakoff, May 2008
- Born: 1 December 1952 (age 73); Holland Park, London, England
- Education: Marlborough House School; Westminster School
- Alma mater: King's College, Cambridge
- Occupations: Playwright, director, screenwriter
- Spouse: Sandy Welch (m. 1983)
- Children: 2
- Parent(s): Alexander Poliakoff; Ina Montagu
- Relatives: Sir Martyn Poliakoff (brother)
- Website: www.stephenpoliakoff.com

Stephen Poliakoff (born 1 December 1952) is a British playwright, director and screenwriter. In 2006 Gerard Gilbert of The Independent described him as the UK's "pre-eminent TV dramatist" and that he had "inherited Dennis Potter's crown".

== Early life ==
Poliakoff was born in Holland Park, West London, to Ina (née Montagu) and Alexander Poliakoff. His father was a Russian-Jewish immigrant and his mother was a British Jew. His maternal grandfather had bought 16th-century mansion Great Fosters, and his maternal great-grandfather was Samuel Montagu, 1st Baron Swaythling.

Poliakoff's paternal grandfather, Joseph, was a Russian Jew who experienced first-hand the effects of the communist revolution in Russia from the family's Moscow flat across from the Kremlin. Near starvation after the revolution, he was given a government job as a district telephone inspector from an admiring commissar and he helped build Moscow's first automatic telephone exchange. He then fled with his family from the Soviet Union to the UK in 1924. His grandfather's experiences under the Bolsheviks inspired Poliakoff's 1984 play Breaking the Silence. Several of these attributes (such as the pager, and hearing aids, including Churchill's) were ascribed to the lead character in Summer of Rockets.

The second of four children, Poliakoff was sent at a young age to Marlborough House School, which he hated. He then attended Westminster School, where he attracted sufficient attention for Granny, a play he wrote and directed, to be reviewed in The Times newspaper. He was still at Westminister when Michael Rudman commissioned Poliakoff's first professionally produced play, "A Day With my Sister," which premiered at the Traverse Theatre, Edinburgh directed by David Halliwell in 1971. After Westminster, he went to King's College, Cambridge to read history but left after two years, later recalling Cambridge as "a stuffy place" and the history course as "shockingly bad".

== Professional life ==
=== Theatre ===
Poliakoff continued to write stage plays, becoming writer-in-residence for the National Theatre at the age of 24, but he became increasingly interested in the medium of television, with Stronger Than the Sun (1977 – BBC1 Play for Today), Bloody Kids (1980 – ATV) directed by Stephen Frears, Caught on a Train (1980 – BBC2 Playhouse) starring Peggy Ashcroft, and Soft Targets (1982 – Play for Today). There were also TV adaptations of his stage plays Hitting Town (1976 – Thames Television/ITV Plays for Britain) and City Sugar (1978 – Scottish Television / ITV The Sunday Drama). These two plays were among his earliest big successes.

Poliakoff's theatre, although well received critically, has never achieved a great level of attention from the critics, apart from their reviews. This has been attributed to the ambiguity of his politics. His approach towards political issues has been described as individual in nature rather than generalising. Some of the recurring themes in his works have been recognised as environmental pollution, due to human intervention, both rural and urban. Most of his plays portray contemporary Britain. He is scared of and fascinated by fascism. He said: "I'm writing about what's happening now, about people searching for beliefs in what is no longer a religious country, and about how individuals of charisma and power can polarise things."

A full-length study of his work, Stephen Poliakoff: On Stage and Screen, was published in 2011 by Robin Nelson.

Nearly all of Poliakoff's plays premiered in London, four at the National Theatre, four at the Royal Shakespeare Company and at the Almeida, Hampstead, Bush and Royal Court. Three of his plays have transferred to the West End. Many of the plays have been performed across Europe and also in the US, Australia and Japan.

In 1976, Poliakoff won the Evening Standard Most Promising Playwright Award for Hitting Town and City Sugar and in 1997 he won the Critic's Circle Best Play Award for the National Theatre production of Blinded By The Sun.

=== Television and cinema ===
Poliakoff's first feature film was Runners, directed by Charles Sturridge, starring James Fox, Jane Asher and Kate Hardie. It received a limited theatrical release in 1983 before being shown in Channel 4's Film on Four slot. His directorial debut was the much-lauded and now rare Hidden City (1988), premiered at the Venice Film Festival and starring Charles Dance, Richard E. Grant and Cassie Stuart. His television career continued with She's Been Away (1989) starring Peggy Ashcroft and also winning awards at Venice, before a return to film with Close My Eyes (1991), starring Clive Owen, Saskia Reeves and Alan Rickman in an elaborate reworking of the incest theme that had been central to Hitting Town (1976), followed by Century (1994), with Owen, Dance and Miranda Richardson. Less successful were Food of Love (1997) with Grant, Nathalie Baye and Joe McGann and The Tribe (1998) starring Joely Richardson and Jeremy Northam, the latter eventually screened on BBC Two in the absence of a cinema distribution deal where it achieved extremely high viewing figures and was immediately repeated.

He subsequently returned to his favoured form, television, this time choosing a flexible serial format resulting in the acclaimed and Prix Italia-winning Shooting the Past (1999), the fresh critical and audience success of Perfect Strangers (2001), a family drama starring Matthew Macfadyen, Michael Gambon and Lindsay Duncan and The Lost Prince (2003), a single drama recognised with an Emmy award rare for a non-American production. The film also featured Miranda Richardson in a Golden Globe-nominated performance as Queen Mary of Teck. Michael Gambon, Gina McKee, Tom Hollander and Bill Nighy appeared in major roles. Late 2005 saw the one-off drama Friends and Crocodiles (2006) starring Damian Lewis and Jodhi May, with its overlapping companion piece, Gideon's Daughter (2006), starring Bill Nighy, Miranda Richardson and Emily Blunt, appearing early the following year. The latter won a Peabody Award in April 2007, with Golden Globes for Nighy and Blunt.

In 2005, he renewed recent criticisms of BBC scheduling and commissioning policy, arguing that the reintroduction of a regular evening slot for one-off plays on BBC1 would provide the re-invigoration of drama output that has become a priority for the corporation.

Joe's Palace was screened on 4 November 2007 on BBC One and Capturing Mary was screened on BBC Two on 12 November 2007. The Culture Show also screened a Poliakoff special, including an interview between Poliakoff and Mark Kermode and a new TV play, A Real Summer, on 10 November.

Glorious 39, starring Romola Garai, Bill Nighy and Julie Christie, premiered at the Toronto International Film Festival in September 2009 and was released in the UK that November.

In 2011, Poliakoff wrote a seven-minute short film, Astonish Me, to celebrate WWF's 50th anniversary. Starring Bill Nighy and Gemma Arterton, the film was shown in Odeon Cinemas in August 2011 and made available on the WWF website and YouTube.

In February and March 2013, Dancing on the Edge, a five-part series which followed the fortunes of a black jazz band in 1930s London, was broadcast by the BBC, and also later won a Golden Globe.

In November/December 2016, his seven-part series Close to the Enemy was transmitted on BBC Two. Close to the Enemy is set in a bombed-out London in the aftermath of the Second World War.

Poliakoff wrote and directed Summer of Rockets, a semi-autobiographical six-part series broadcast by the BBC in June 2019. It is set in 1958, just as the UK is testing its first hydrogen bomb, and focuses on a Russian Jewish hearing aid inventor (played by Toby Stephens) who goes to work for MI5. It also stars Keeley Hawes, Linus Roache, and Timothy Spall.

In 2026, it was announced that his next project is an eight-part miniseries adaptation of Peter Portelli's novel The Order. It is set to film in Malta in 2027.

== Personal life ==
Poliakoff lives in London and is married to fellow scriptwriter Sandy Welch, with whom he has two children. He was awarded a CBE in the Queen's Birthday Honours list 2007 and elected a Fellow of the Royal Society of Literature in 1985.

His brother, Sir Martyn Poliakoff, a research chemist and lecturer, is a Fellow of the Royal Society, being, until November 2016, its Foreign Secretary and vice-president. He is also the presenter of a YouTube educational series on chemistry, The Periodic Table of Videos.

== Works ==
=== Stage plays ===
All London except where otherwise stated:

- A Day With my Sister Traverse Theatre (Edinburgh) 1971
- Pretty Boy Royal Court Theatre, June 1972
- Berlin Days Little Theatre, 1973
- Sad Beat Up Little Theatre, 1974
- The Carnation Gang Bush Theatre, 1974
- Clever Soldiers Hampstead Theatre, 1974
- Heroes Royal Court Theatre, July 1975
- Hitting Town Bush Theatre, 1975
- City Sugar Bush Theatre, October 1975; Comedy Theatre, March 1976; Phoenix Theatre (New York), January 1978
- Strawberry Fields Young Vic, August 1976; NT Cottesloe, 1977; Manhattan Theatre Club (New York), May 1978
- Shout Across the River RSC at the Donmar Warehouse, 1978; Phoenix Theatre (New York), December 1979
- American Days ICA, June 1979; Manhattan Theatre Club (New York), December 1980
- The Summer Party Crucible Theatre, Sheffield 1980
- Favourite Nights Lyric Theatre Hammersmith, November 1981
- Breaking the Silence Pit Theatre, RSC Barbican, November 1984; transferred to the Mermaid Theatre 1985
- Coming in to Land National Theatre Lyttelton, January 1987
- Playing With Trains Pit Theatre, RSC Barbican, November 1989
- Sienna Red Peter Hall Company, May 1992
- Sweet Panic (also directed) Hampstead Theatre, February 1996
- Blinded by the Sun National Theatre Cottesloe, September 1996
- Talk of the City (also directed) RSC Swan, Stratford 1998; Young Vic February 1999
- Remember This National Theatre Lyttelton, October 1999
- Sweet Panic revival (also directed) Duke of York's Theatre, November 2003
- My City (also directed) Almeida Theatre, September 2011

=== Films ===
- Runners (director Charles Sturridge, 1983)
- Hidden City (1988)
- Close My Eyes (1991)
- Century (1993)
- Food of Love (1997)
- Glorious 39 (2009)
- Astonish Me (short) (director Charles Sturridge, 2011)

=== Television dramas and films ===
All (originally) made for British television unless otherwise stated.

- Hitting Town (1976) (ITV play, on Plays for Britain DVD, adapted from the stage play of the same name)
- Stronger than the Sun (1977) (part of Play for Today series)
- City Sugar (1978) (part of Sunday Drama series)
- Bloody Kids (director Stephen Frears, 1979)
- Caught on a Train (1980)
- Soft Targets (1982) (part of Play for Today series)
- Termeszet (Hungary, 1981)
- Doppelte Welt, Die (West Germany, 1985)
- She's Been Away (1989)
- Frontiers (co-written with Sandy Welch, 1996)
- The Tribe (1998)
- Shooting the Past (1999)
- Perfect Strangers (2001)
- The Lost Prince (2003)
- Friends and Crocodiles (2006)
- Gideon's Daughter (2006)
- A Real Summer (2007)
- Joe's Palace (2007)
- Capturing Mary (2007)
- Dancing on the Edge (2013)
- Close to the Enemy (2016)
- Summer of Rockets (2019)

== Prizes and awards ==
Poliakoff has received the following awards:

- Evening Standard Award for Most Promising Playwright (1976)
- BAFTA (Best Single Television Drama) (1980)
- Evening Standard Award for Best Film (1992)
- Critics' Circle Award for Best New Stage Play (1996)
- Royal Television Society Award (1999)
- Prix Italia (1999)
- International Television Festival Cinema Tour Ecran (1999)
- BAFTA (Dennis Potter Writer's Award) (2001)
- Peabody Award (2002)
- Royal Television Society Award Best Writer (2002)
- Royal Television Society Award Best Drama Serial (2002)
- BANFF Award (2002)
- South Bank Show Award (2004)
- EMMY Award (2005)
- Peabody Award (2006)
- CBE (2007)
