= Martyn Poliakoff =

British chemist (born 1947)

Sir Martyn Poliakoff CBE FRS FREng FRSC FIChemE
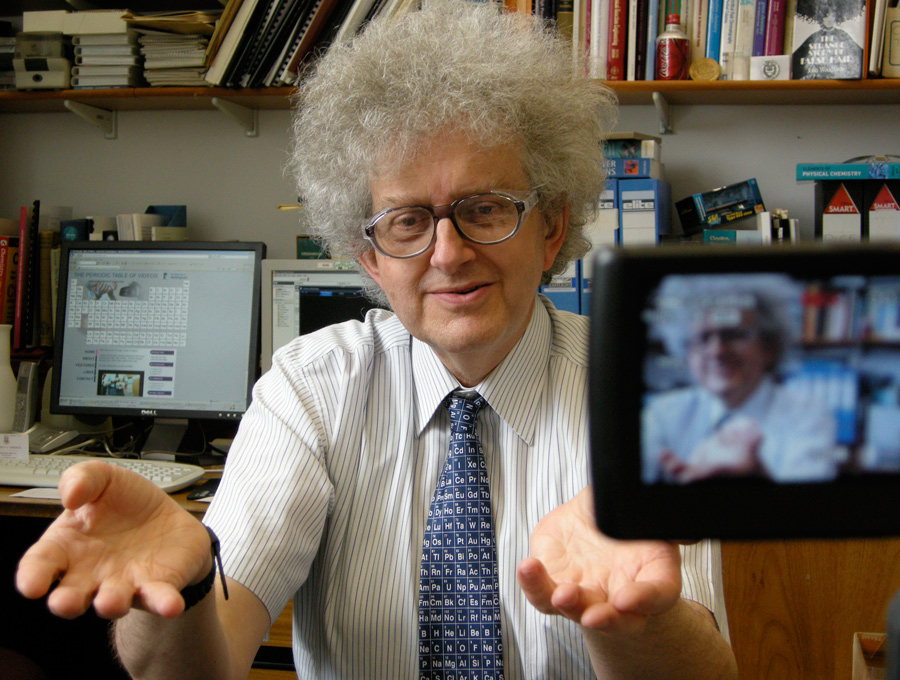
- Poliakoff during the filming of a Periodic Videos video
- Born: 16 December 1947 (age 78); London, England
- Education: King's College, Cambridge (BA, PhD)
- Known for: Periodic Videos
- Spouse: Janet Frances Keene (m. 1969)
- Children: 2
- Parents: Alexander Poliakoff (father); Ina Montagu (mother)
- Relatives: Stephen Poliakoff (brother); Joseph Poliakoff (grandfather)
- Awards: Meldola Medal and Prize (1976); FRSC (2002); FRS (2002); FIChemE (2004); CBE (2008); Knight Bachelor (2015); FREng (2017); Longstaff Prize (2019); Michael Faraday Prize (2019)
- Scientific career
- Workplaces: Newcastle University; University of Nottingham
- Thesis: The matrix isolation of large molecules. The photochemistry of transition metal carbonyls (1973)
- Doctoral advisor: J. J. Turner
- Doctoral students: Andrew Ian Cooper
- Martyn Poliakoff's voice from the BBC programme Material World, 28 August 2008
- Website: nottingham.ac.uk/chemistry/people/martyn.poliakoff

Sir Martyn Poliakoff (born 16 December 1947) is a British chemist known for his work on green chemistry and for being the main presenter on the popular YouTube channel Periodic Videos. The core subjects of his academic work are supercritical fluids, infrared spectroscopy and lasers. He is a research professor in chemistry at the University of Nottingham. As well as carrying out research at the University of Nottingham, he is a lecturer, teaching a number of modules including green chemistry.

== Early life and education ==
Poliakoff was born to a British-Jewish mother, Ina (née Montagu), and a Russian-Jewish father, Alexander Poliakoff. He has a younger brother, the screenwriter and director Stephen Poliakoff. His paternal grandfather, Joseph Poliakoff, was a prolific inventor of electrical devices who experienced the communist revolution in Russia first-hand, and immigrated to the United Kingdom in 1924.

Poliakoff was educated at Westminster School. He then studied chemistry at King's College, Cambridge, graduating with a BA degree in 1969. While an undergraduate, he became close friends with Tony Judt, who later became a historian and writer. Poliakoff received a PhD in chemistry from Cambridge in 1973 for research supervised by J.J. Turner.

== Career and research ==
In 1972, Poliakoff moved to Newcastle University and in 1979 was appointed a lecturer at the University of Nottingham, where he was subsequently promoted to professor in 1991. His research has been funded by the EPSRC.

Poliakoff is a global leader in the field of green chemistry with a specific interest in the applications of supercritical fluids. These highly compressed gases possess properties of gases and liquids that permit interesting chemical reactions without the need for organic solvents, which endanger both health and the environment. His contributions have enabled the development of supercritical carbon dioxide and water solvent systems to replace traditional organic solvents at the industrial scale. As foreign secretary and vice-president of the Royal Society from 2011 to 2016, he worked to represent and further the impact of UK science around the world.

=== Popular science ===
Poliakoff is the narrator in most of a series of over 750 short videos called The Periodic Table of Videos, a popular science project produced by Brady Haran, originally intended to familiarise the public with all 118 elements of the periodic table. The project has since expanded to cover molecules; there are also several special videos about other chemical topics. He hit the news for calculating that the FIFA World Cup Trophy could not have been made from solid gold as it would be too heavy to raise aloft. Poliakoff showed some videos at IUPAC's elements inauguration in the Central Club of Scientists of the Russian Academy of Sciences in Moscow.

In 2019 he collaborated with his daughter Ellen, among others, to produce an experimental version of the periodic table which was turned upside down, to see if that helped young learners get to grips with the underlying mechanisms.

=== Honours and awards ===
Poliakoff was awarded the Meldola Medal and Prize from the Royal Society of Chemistry in 1976. He was elected Fellow of the Royal Society (FRS) in 2002, Fellow of the Royal Society of Chemistry (FRSC) also in 2002, and Fellow of the Institution of Chemical Engineers (FIChemE) in 2004. He served on the IChemE Council between 2009 and 2013. Poliakoff was appointed Commander of the Order of the British Empire (CBE) in the 2008 New Year Honours and is a member of the Advisory Council for the Campaign for Science and Engineering since 2008. In 2008, he was elected an Honorary Member of the Chemical Society of Ethiopia and a Foreign Member of the Russian Academy of Sciences in 2011. He took up the positions of Foreign Secretary and vice-president of the Royal Society in November 2011, positions which are held for a fixed five-year period. In 2011, he won the Nyholm Prize for Education.

Poliakoff also received an Honorary Doctorate from Heriot-Watt University in 2011.

In 2012, Poliakoff was elected a Fellow of the Academia Europaea and in 2013, an Associate Fellow of TWAS, the World Academy of Science. He was elected an Associate Member of the Ethiopian Academy of Sciences in 2014. Poliakoff was knighted in the 2015 New Year Honours for services to the chemical sciences. He was also elected an Honorary Fellow of the Chinese Chemical Society in 2015. Poliakoff was awarded the Lord Lewis Prize in 2016 for his work concerning the applications of supercritical fluids, and for his work in the development of science policy within the EU and globally. In 2016, Poliakoff was elected Fellow of the American Association for the Advancement of Science (FAAAS), and in 2017 a Fellow of the Royal Academy of Engineering (FREng). In 2019, he was awarded the Royal Society of London Michael Faraday Prize for science communication for his work on the Periodic Videos. He was also awarded the 2019 Longstaff Prize for his "outstanding contributions to green chemistry and for participating centrally in the creation of the Periodic Table Videos". At the end of 2023, Poliakoff was elected (in the division of chemistry) a Foreign Academician of the Chinese Academy of Sciences.

Poliakoff was awarded the American Association for the Advancement of Science (AAAS) David and Betty Hamburg Award for Science Diplomacy in 2026.

A tram in Nottingham's tram network was named after him in 2021.

== Personal life ==
Poliakoff has a daughter, Ellen Poliakoff, a psychology lecturer at the University of Manchester; and a son, Simon Poliakoff, a physics teacher at the Priory School, Hitchin. Martyn Poliakoff produced a web eulogy of close friend Tony Judt in 2010.
