= Alexander Poliakoff =

Russian-born British electronics engineer, inventor and businessman (1910–1996)

Alexander Poliakoff OBE
- Born: Aleksandr Iosifovich Polyakov; 20 August 1910; Losino-Ostrovskaya, near Moscow, Russian Empire
- Died: 26 July 1996 (aged 85); London, England
- Occupations: Electronics engineer, inventor, businessman
- Known for: Chairman of Multitone Electronics for over 40 years
- Spouse: Ina Montagu
- Children: Sir Martyn Poliakoff; Stephen Poliakoff
- Parent: Joseph Poliakoff

Alexander Poliakoff OBE (Russian: Алекса́ндр Ио́сифович Поляко́в; 20 August 1910 – 26 July 1996) was a Russian-born British electronics engineer, inventor and businessman, and the chairman of Multitone Electronics for over 40 years.

Poliakoff was born in 1910 at his parents' country house at Losino-Ostrovskaya, near Moscow, the only son of Joseph Poliakoff, a Russian-Jewish telephone and sound engineer and inventor, and Flora Shabbat, the granddaughter of a textile millionaire. He was of Jewish descent.

In 1937, Poliakoff married Ina Montagu (died 1992), granddaughter of the British-Jewish banker Samuel Montagu, 1st Baron Swaythling. Their elder son is the chemist Sir Martyn Poliakoff, and their younger son is the playwright Stephen Poliakoff.

He was appointed OBE in the 1982 New Year Honours.

His reminiscences were published in The Silver Samovar - Atlantida Press 1996 (ISBN 5-88011-013-3)
