= Hitting Town =

Stage play by Stephen Poliakoff

Hitting Town is a stage play written by Stephen Poliakoff and first performed in April 1975 at the Bush Theatre directed by Tim Fywell. Written early in his career, the play won Poliakoff the Evening Standard Theatre Award for Most Promising Playwright. The critic Michael Billington said it was "reminder of Poliakoff's precocious talent".

In the original production Judy Monahan and James Aubrey played the lead roles and were supported by Lynne Miller.

It was a shocking play in its time partly because it dealt with an incestuous relationship between a brother and sister.

Hitting Town was developed into a television play with Thames Television for ITV Plays For Britain. The television adaptation was half shot on location on single-camera video and the other half in the studio using multiple cameras. Directed by theatre director Peter Gill, it stars Mick Ford and Deborah Norton with Lynne Miller repeating her stage performance as the rebellious waitress, Nicola.

Hitting Town was released for the first time on DVD in 2013.

== Storyline ==
Hitting Town is a play of just seven juxtaposed scenes, loosely shaped around a visit by Ralph to his sister Clare's flat in their home town, Leicester. Clare is depressed having recently split up with her boyfriend. Ralph offers to take her out, ‘hitting the town’ as it were. The brother and sister travel through a landscape of Wimpy bars, shopping malls, subterranean discos, ending up in bed together. Set at the time of the Guildford and Birmingham bombings the play creates a feel for the contemporary mid-1970s. Poliakoff described the atmosphere of the time, ‘as you walked down the streets you expected cars to blow up in front of you’ (1997).

== Controversy ==
Though not sexually explicit, the television adaptation of Hitting Town caused a considerable stir in 1976. Mary Whitehouse tried to have the Independent Broadcasting Authority prosecuted for screening the show. The matter was referred to the Attorney General.
