= Periodic Videos =

YouTube channel by Brady Haran and Martyn Poliakoff

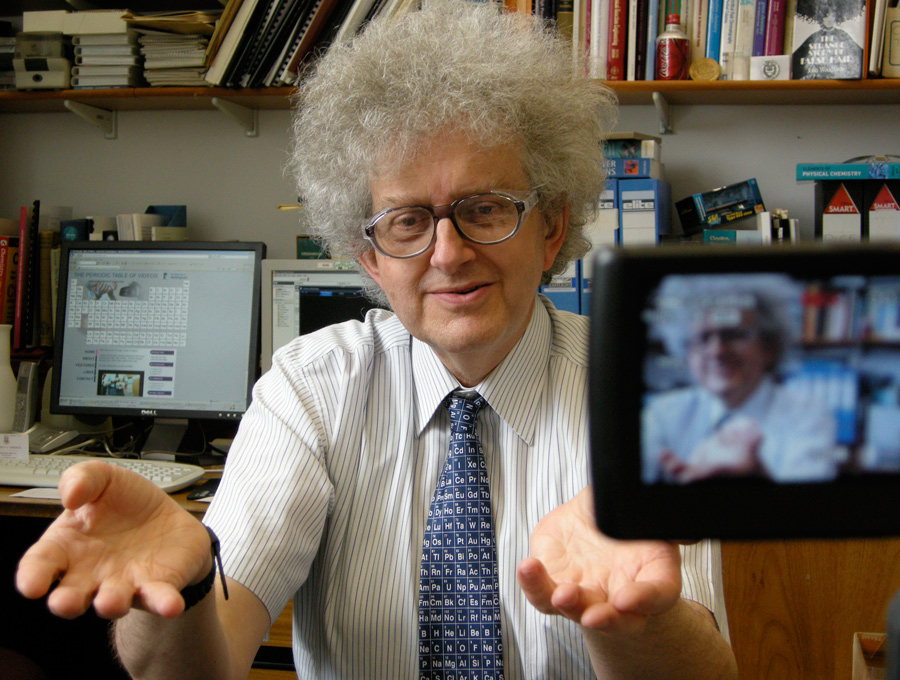
- Sir Martyn Poliakoff, a recurring presenter on the channel

YouTube information
- Channel: Periodic Videos
- Years active: 2008–present
- Genre: Educational entertainment
- Subscribers: 1.63 million
- Views: 297.27 million
- Last updated: 28 July 2026
- Website: Official website

Periodic Videos (also known as The Periodic Table of Videos) is a video project and YouTube channel on chemistry. It consists of a series of videos about chemical elements and the periodic table, with additional videos on other topics in chemistry and related fields. They are published on YouTube and produced by Brady Haran, a former BBC video journalist, mainly featuring Sir Martyn Poliakoff, Peter Licence, Stephen Liddle, Debbie Kays, Neil Barnes, Sam Tang, and other scientists at the University of Nottingham.

== Development ==
The project began recording on 9 June 2008 and the initial videos were completed on 17 July 2008. The collection includes videos, each just a few minutes long, for all 118 known elements with a video for each element, as well as many additional supplemental chemistry videos. The 118 element videos and introduction videos were all shot unscripted in June and July 2008.

Since the initial videos were completed in 2008 the team has been refining and uploading revised versions of the videos with new video and in higher resolutions. A key example of this revising is with the xenon video that was redone in honour of professor Neil Bartlett who died on 5 August 2008; Bartlett prepared one of the first xenon compounds, xenon hexafluoroplatinate.

== Content ==
Poliakoff is the most visible presenter on the videos; his hair, reminiscent of Albert Einstein or a mad scientist, is frequently commented upon. The combination of the professor's hair and amusing experiments has made these videos quite popular. Although uncertain what to think about the attention given to his hair, Professor Poliakoff is excited with the success of the videos, stating "With a few hours of work, I have lectured to more students than I have reached in my entire career." The YouTube channel as of December 2021, has over 1.5 million subscribers and the videos have surpassed 260 million views. The YouTube channel is now one of the most popular chemistry related channels on all of YouTube. The producers of the videos have received praise from Nobel Laureates, chemistry professors, and the general public, says Professor Poliakoff. Chemistry Nobel Laureate Roald Hoffmann has even offered his praise of the videos, stating they "are like the best reality show I've ever seen – the universe revealing itself, element by element." In 2019, Poliakoff was awarded the Royal Society of London Michael Faraday Prize for science communication for his work on the videos.

The videos feature various experiments and demonstrations of the elements, some too dangerous to be performed in a classroom. Though the presenters take appropriate precautions when doing such experiments and provide adequate warnings, some scientists have criticized the dangerous experiments fearing people might try them at home and get hurt. The intent of the videos is to bring chemistry to a new generation of students and to get them enthused about science and understand how chemists think and what chemists are trying to do. Many school teachers now incorporate these videos into their classes, and the professor has even recorded video responses to some of the students' questions. Some of the most popular videos are those of sodium, potassium, and uranium.

The Periodic Table of Videos team has also performed live. Their first performance was in May 2009 at the Broadway Media Centre in Nottingham; in July 2010 they performed at the EuroScience Open Forum (ESOF) in Turin, Italy.

== Financing ==
A grant from the Engineering and Physical Sciences Research Council of £25,249 was awarded on 19 January 2010 to extend the video library to include topical videos on molecules of general interest. The first of these new videos were on carbon dioxide and methane.

== Videos ==
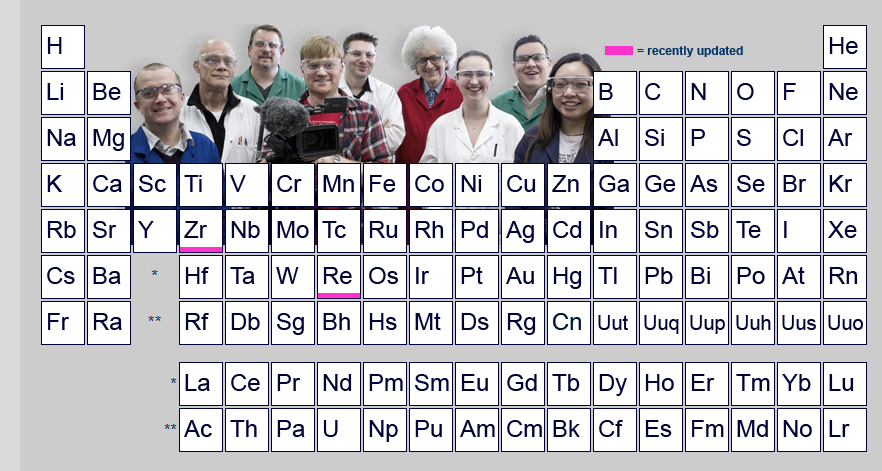
Periodic table

The Periodic Table of Videos has filmed at least one video for each of the 118 elements (from hydrogen to oganesson). They have also filmed several videos that discuss molecules such as D_{2}O (heavy water) and sulfuric acid. Also filmed are "Chem definitions" that provide an explanation to words that are used in chemistry. Lastly, the team has filmed "Roadtrips" where they travel to different places in the world that have an importance in chemistry (such as the mine outside Ytterby, Sweden, which had four elements – yttrium, terbium, erbium, and ytterbium – named after it.)
