= Lynne Miller =

British actress (born 1951)

- Born: 27 April 1951 (age 74); London, England
- Occupation: Actress
- Years active: 1974–present

Lynne Miller (born 27 April 1951) is a British actress. Her first TV role was in 1974, but she is best known for the role of Cathy Marshall in The Bill, a TV series she appeared in from 1989 to 1996. Since that time she has appeared mostly on stage. She is married to photographer Nobby Clark.

In 2021, Miller recorded an Audio Commentary for an episode of The Bill called "Forget-Me-Not", alongside writer Russell Lewis, released on The Bill Podcast Patreon Channel, sharing her memories of the series.

== Filmography ==
Year	Title	Role	Notes
1974	Haunted: Poor Girl	Florence Chasty	TV movie
1974	Billy Liar (TV series)	Maureen	Episode: "Billy and the Alter Ego"
1975	Thriller		TV series, Episode: "Murder Motel"
1978	Angels (TV series)	Lynn Harris	Episode: "The Visitor"
1979	Hazell and the Public Enemy	Rita	
1982	Who Dares Wins	Melissa	
1984	Travelling Man	Chrissie	TV series, Episode: "First Leg"
1989–1996	The Bill	W.P.C. Cathy Marshall	TV series, 346 epsidoes
1998	The Tribe	Judith	
2023	Doctors	Hilda Jackson	Episode: "Acting the Maggot"

== Theatre ==
- Ivy & Joan (2014)
- Not Waving
- Pillion
- Funny Peculiar
- Tartuff
- Miracle
- The Usual Table (2002)
- The Good Hope
- Steaming (1997)
- The Artful Widow
- Scribes
- City Sugar (1975)
- Hitting Town
