= List of awards and nominations received by Michael Gambon =

Sir Michael Gambon awards and nominations
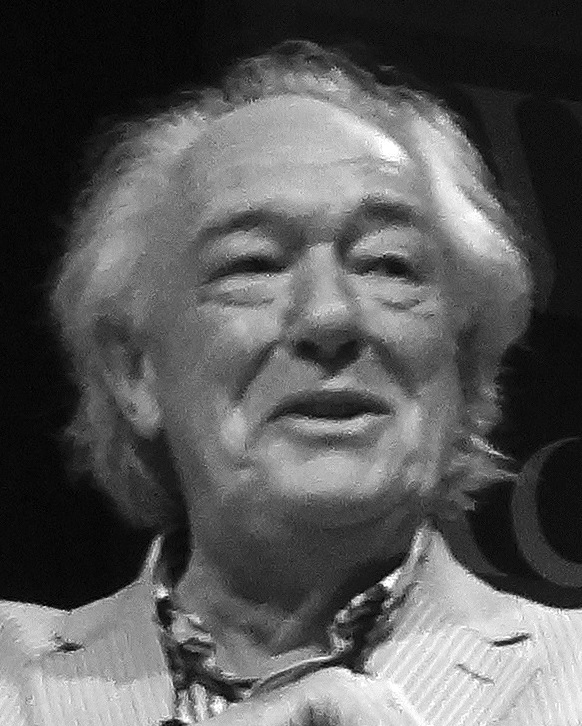
- Gambon in 2013
Total
Award	Wins	Nominations
BAFTA Awards	4	4
Berlin International Film Festival	1	1
British Independent Film Awards	1	1
Critics' Choice Movie Awards	1	3
Critics' Choice Television Awards	0	1
Critics' Circle Theatre Awards	2	2
Drama Desk Award	0	1
Evening Standard Awards	3	3
Florida Film Critics Circle	0	1
Golden Globe Awards	0	1
IGN Awards	0	1
Irish Times Theatre Awards	0	1
Irish Film & Television Awards	1	3
Laurence Olivier Awards	3	13
New York Film Festival	0	1
Online Film Critics Society	1	1
People's Choice Awards	1	1
Phoenix Film Critics Society	0	1
Primetime Emmy Awards	0	2
Royal Television Society Awards	2	2
San Diego Film Critics Society	1	1
Santa Barbara International Film Festival	1	1
Satellite Awards	1	2
Saturn Awards	0	1
Scream Awards	1	2
Screen Actors Guild Awards	2	2
Sitges Film Festival	1	1
Theatergoers' Choice Awards	0	3
Theater World Awards	1	1
Tony Award	0	1
WDCAFCA Awards	0	1
Wins	28
Nominations	60

The following is a list of awards and nominations received by Sir Michael Gambon.

Sir Michael Gambon was an Irish-English actor known for his extensive work on stage and screen. Over his six decade long career he received numerous accolades including four British Academy Television Awards, a Critics' Choice Movie Award, two Screen Actors Guild Awards and three Laurence Olivier Awards as well as nominations for two Primetime Emmy Awards, a Golden Globe Award, and a Tony Award.

Gambon started his professional acting career with the Royal National Theatre with Laurence Olivier. For his roles on the West End he received three Laurence Olivier Award for A Chorus of Disapproval (1985), A View from the Bridge (1987), and Man of the Moment (1990). For his Broadway debut he was nominated for the Tony Award for Best Actor in a Play for his role in revival of David Hare's Skylight (1996)

Gambon won four British Academy Television Award for Best Actor for playing Philip Marlow in The Singing Detective (1987), Squire Hamley in Wives and Daughters (2000), John Harrison in Longitude (2001), and Raymond Symon in Perfect Strangers (2002). He also was nominated for two Primetime Emmy Awards for portraying Lyndon B. Johnson in the HBO film Path to War (2002), and playing the family patriarch, Mr. Woodhouse in the BBC One series Emma (2009). On film, he received two Screen Actors Guild Awards for Outstanding Ensemble Cast in a Motion Picture for Robert Altman's murder-mystery Gosford Park (2001), and Tom Hooper's historical drama The King's Speech (2010).

In 1990 he was named Commander of the Order of the British Empire (CBE), awarded by the British Government in the 1990 New Year Honours. and invested by The Prince of Wales. In 1998, he was given the title of Knight Bachelor; awarded by the British Government in the 1998 New Year Honours. The investiture by Queen Elizabeth II took place on 17 July 1998. Gambon, despite being Irish, retained British citizenship making the Knighthood substantive rather than honorary. In 2020, he was listed at No. 28 on The Irish Times's list of Ireland's greatest film actors.

== Major associations ==
=== BAFTA Awards ===
Year	Category	Nominated work	Result	Ref.
British Academy Television Awards
1987	Best Actor	The Singing Detective	Won	
2000	Best Actor	Wives and Daughters	Won	
2001	Best Actor	Longitude	Won	
2002	Best Actor	Perfect Strangers	Won	

=== Emmy Awards ===
Year	Category	Nominated work	Result	Ref.
Primetime Emmy Awards
2002	Outstanding Lead Actor in a Miniseries or a Movie	Path to War	Nominated	
2010	Outstanding Supporting Actor - Miniseries or a Movie	Emma	Nominated	

=== Golden Globe Awards ===
Year	Category	Nominated work	Result	Ref.
2002	Best Actor in a Mini-Series or a TV Movie	Path to War	Nominated	

=== Screen Actors Guild Awards ===
Year	Category	Nominated work	Result	Ref.
2001	Outstanding Ensemble Cast in a Motion Picture	Gosford Park	Won	
2010	Outstanding Ensemble Cast in a Motion Picture	The King's Speech	Won	

=== Olivier Awards ===
Year	Category	Nominated work	Result	Ref.
1979	Best Actor of the Year in a New Play	Betrayal	Nominated	
1980	Best Actor in a Revival	The Life of Galileo	Nominated	
1983	Best Actor in a New Play	Tales from Hollywood	Nominated	
1985	Best Comedy Performance	A Chorus of Disapproval	Won	
1987	Best Actor of the Year	A View from the Bridge	Won	
1990	Best Comedy Performance	Man of the Moment	Won	
1996	Best Actor in a Play	Skylight	Nominated	
1998	Best Actor in a Play	Tom and Clem	Nominated	
1999	Best Actor in a Play	The Unexpected Man	Nominated	
2001	Best Actor in a Play	The Caretaker	Nominated	
2003	Best Actor in a Play	A Number	Nominated	
2005	Best Actor in a Play	Endgame	Nominated	
2009	Best Actor in a Play	No Man's Land	Nominated	

=== Tony Awards ===
Year	Category	Nominated work	Result	Ref.
1997	Best Actor in a Play	Skylight	Nominated	

== Other theatre awards ==
Organizations	Year	Category	Work	Result	Ref.
Critics' Circle Theatre Awards	1990	Best Actor	Man of the Moment	Won	
Critics' Circle Theatre Awards	2000	Best Actor	The Caretaker	Won	
Drama Desk Awards	1997	Best Actor in a Play	Skylight	Nominated	
Evening Standard Awards	1987	Best Actor	A View from the Bridge	Won	
Evening Standard Awards	1995	Best Actor	Volpone	Won	
Evening Standard Awards	2010	The Lebedev Special Award for Contribution to British theatre		Honoured	
Irish Times Theatre Awards	2007	Best Actor	Eh Joe	Nominated	
Theatregoers' Choice Awards	2005	Best Actor in Play	Endgame	Nominated	
Theatregoers' Choice Awards	2007	Best Solo Performance	Eh Joe	Nominated	
Theatregoers' Choice Awards	2011	Best Solo Performance	Krapp's Last Tape	Nominated	
Theatre World Awards	1997	Best Ensemble Performance	Skylight	Won	

== Critics awards ==
Organizations	Year	Category	Work	Result	Ref.
Critics' Choice Movie Awards	2002	Best Acting Ensemble	Gosford Park	Won	
Critics' Choice Movie Awards	2005	Best Acting Ensemble	The Life Aquatic with Steve Zissou	Nominated	
Critics' Choice Movie Awards	2011	Best Acting Ensemble	The King's Speech	Nominated	
Critics' Choice Television Awards	2015	Best Actor in a Movie/Limited Series	The Casual Vacancy	Nominated	
Florida Film Critics Circle Awards	2002	Best Ensemble Cast	Gosford Park	Nominated	
Online Film Critics Society Awards	2002	Best Ensemble	Gosford Park	Won	
Phoenix Film Critics Society	2002	Best Acting Ensemble	Gosford Park	Won	
Phoenix Film Critics Society	2011	Best Acting Ensemble	The King's Speech	Nominated	
San Diego Film Critics Society	2011	Best Ensemble Performance	Harry Potter and the Deathly Hallows – Part 2	Won	
Washington D.C. Area Film Critics Association	2011	Best Cast	Harry Potter and the Deathly Hallows – Part 2	Nominated	

== Miscellaneous awards ==
Organizations	Year	Category	Work	Result	Ref.
Berlin International Film Festival	2007	Silver Berlin Bear	The Good Shepherd	Won	
British Independent Film Awards	2012	The Richard Harris Award		Honoured	
Broadcasting Press Guild Awards	1987	Best Actor	The Singing Detective	Won	
Broadcasting Press Guild Awards	2008	Best Actor	Cranford, Celebration, Joe's Palace	Nominated	
IGN Movie Awards	2011	Best Ensemble Cast	Harry Potter and the Deathly Hallows – Part 2	Nominated	
Irish Film and Television Awards	2008	Best Actor	Celebration	Nominated	
Irish Film and Television Awards	2010	Best Supporting Actor	Harry Potter and the Half-Blood Prince	Nominated	
Irish Film and Television Awards	2017	Lifetime Achievement Award		Honoured	
People's Choice Awards	2011	Favorite Ensemble Movie Cast	Harry Potter and the Deathly Hallows – Part 2	Won	
Royal Television Society Awards	1987	Best Performance - Male	The Singing Detective	Won	
Royal Television Society Awards	2000	Best Performance - Male	Wives and Daughters	Won	
Satellite Award	2002	Outstanding Motion Picture Ensemble	Gosford Park	Nominated	
Satellite Award	2015	Best Actor in a Miniseries or TV Film	The Casual Vacancy	Nominated	
Santa Barbara International Film Festival	2011	Best Ensemble Cast	The King's Speech	Won	
Saturn Awards	1993	Best Actor	Toys	Nominated	
Scream Awards	2009	Best Ensemble	Harry Potter and the Half-Blood Prince	Won	
Scream Awards	2011	Best Ensemble	Harry Potter and the Deathly Hallows – Part 2	Nominated	
Sitges Film Festival	1989	Best Actor	The Cook the Thief His Wife & Her Lover	Won	
New York Film Festival	2019	Best Supporting Actor in a Feature Film	The Last Witness	Nominated	

== Honorary degrees ==
- 2007: Honorary Degree from the University of Kent on 12 July in Canterbury, England.
- 2002: Honorary Doctorate of Arts from the University of Greenwich on 8 November in Greenwich, England.
- He also had a star on Avenue of Stars, London.
