= Michael Gambon on screen and stage =

The following is a list of film, television, theatre, and radio credits of Irish-British actor Sir Michael Gambon.

== Film ==
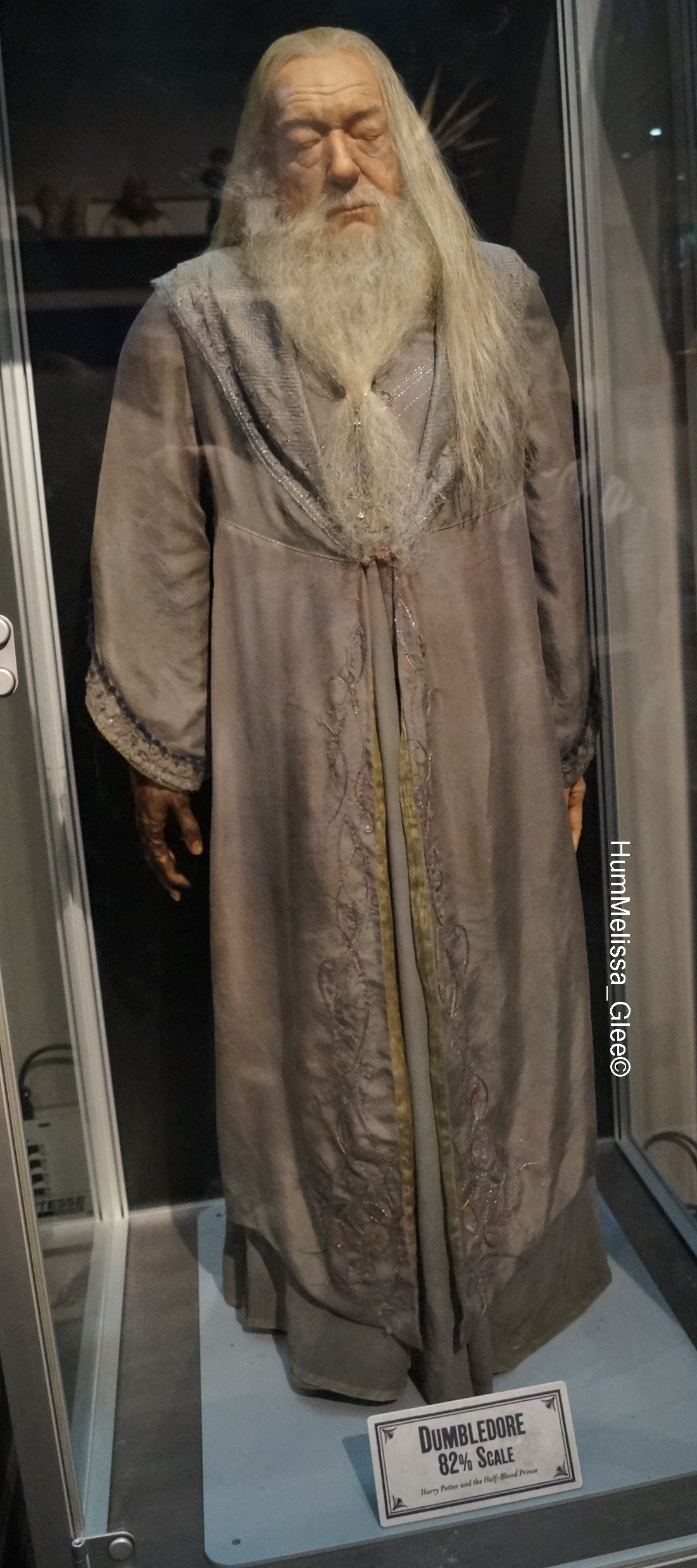
Waxwork of Michael Gambon as character Albus Dumbledore.

Year	Title	Role	Notes
1965	Othello	Company	
1973	Nothing but the Night	Inspector Grant	
1974	The Beast Must Die	Jan Jarmokowski	
1985	Turtle Diary	George Fairbairn	
1988	Paris by Night	Gerald Paige	
1988	Missing Link	Narrator	
1989	The Rachel Papers	Doctor Knowd	
1989	A Dry White Season	Magistrate	
1989	The Cook, the Thief, His Wife & Her Lover	Albert Spica	
1991	Mobsters	Salvatore Maranzano	
1992	Toys	General Leland Zevo	
1994	A Man of No Importance	Ivor J. Garney	
1994	Clean Slate	Philip Cornell	
1994	Squanto: A Warrior's Tale	Sir George	
1994	The Browning Version	Dr. Frobisher	
1995	Bullet to Beijing	Alex	
1995	Two Deaths	Daniel Pavenic	
1995	Nothing Personal	Leonard	
1995	Midnight in Saint Petersburg	Alex	
1996	Mary Reilly	Mr. Reilly	
1996	The Innocent Sleep	Det. Insp. Matheson	
1997	The Gambler	Fyodor Dostoyevsky	
1997	The Wings of the Dove	Lionel Croy	
1998	Dancing at Lughnasa	Father Jack Mundy	
1998	Plunkett & Macleane	Lord Gibson	
1999	A Monkey's Tale	Master Martin	Voice
1999	Dead on Time	Maurice	
1999	The Insider	Thomas Sandefur	
1999	The Last September	Sir Richard Naylor	
1999	Sleepy Hollow	Baltus Van Tassel	
2001	Gosford Park	Sir William McCordle	
2001	Charlotte Gray	Levade	
2001	High Heels and Low Lifes	Kerrigan	
2001	Christmas Carol: The Movie	Ghost of Christmas Present	Voice
2002	Ali G Indahouse	Prime Minister	
2003	Little Wolf's Book of Badness	Uncle Bigbad	Voice
2003	The Actors	Barreller	
2003	Open Range	Denton Baxter	
2003	Sylvia	Professor Thomas	
2003	Deep Blue	Narrator	Documentary film
2004	Standing Room Only	Larry	
2004	Being Julia	Jimmie Langton	
2004	Sky Captain and the World of Tomorrow	Morris Paley	
2004	Layer Cake	Eddie Temple	
2004	The Life Aquatic with Steve Zissou	Oseary Drakoulias	
2004	Harry Potter and the Prisoner of Azkaban	Professor Albus Dumbledore	
2005	Harry Potter and the Goblet of Fire	Professor Albus Dumbledore	
2005	Stories of Lost Souls	Larry	Segment: "Standing Room Only"
2006	The Omen	Bugenhagen	
2006	The Good Shepherd	Dr. Fredericks	
2006	John Duffy's Brother	Narrator	
2006	Amazing Grace	Charles Fox	
2007	The Good Night	Alan Weigert	
2007	The Baker	Leo	
2007	The Alps	Narrator	Documentary film
2007	Harry Potter and the Order of the Phoenix	Professor Albus Dumbledore	
2008	Brideshead Revisited	Lord Marchmain	
2009	Harry Potter and the Half-Blood Prince	Professor Albus Dumbledore	
2009	Fantastic Mr. Fox	Franklin Bean	Voice
2010	The Book of Eli	George	
2010	The King's Speech	King George V	
2010	Harry Potter and the Deathly Hallows – Part 1	Professor Albus Dumbledore	Cameo
2011	Harry Potter and the Deathly Hallows – Part 2	Professor Albus Dumbledore	Cameo
2012	Quartet	Cedric Livingstone	
2014	Unity	Narrator	Documentary film
2014	Paddington	Uncle Pastuzo	Voice
2016	Dad's Army	Private Godfrey	
2016	Hail, Caesar!	Narrator	
2017	Viceroy's House	General Hastings Ismay	
2017	Mad to Be Normal	Sydney Kotok	
2017	Victoria & Abdul	Lord Salisbury	
2017	Kingsman: The Golden Circle	Sir Giles / Arthur	
2017	Paddington 2	Uncle Pastuzo	Voice
2018	The Last Witness	Frank Hamilton	
2018	King of Thieves	Billy "The Fish" Lincoln	
2018	The Death & Life of John F. Donovan	Man in Restaurant / Narrator	Double role; voice role
2018	Johnny English Strikes Again	Agent Five	Uncredited cameo
2019	Judy	Bernard Delfont	
2019	Cordelia	Moses	

== Television ==
Year	Title	Role	Notes
1967	Much Ado About Nothing	Watchman No. 4	Television movie, BBC
1967	Softly, Softly	Pete Lucas	Episode: "Appointment in Wyvern"
1967–1978	Play of the Month	Various characters	5 episodes
1968	Public Eye	Unknown	Episode: "Have Mud, Will Throw"
1969	Fraud Squad	Rex Lucien	Episode: "Last Exit to Leichstenstein"
1968–1970	The Borderers	Gavin Ker	26 episodes
1970	Confession	Mr. Tennent	Episode: "People Who Visit Glass Houses"
1971	Eyeless in Gaza	Mark Staithes	5 episodes
1972	The Challengers	John Killane	5 episodes
1972	The Man Outside	Ralph Kenward	Episode: "Cuculus Canorus"
1972	Softly, Softly: Task Force	Cranley	Episode: "Welcome to the Club"
1972	Kate	Edward	Episode: "A Fact of Life"
1973	Menace	Ellis	Episode: "Judas Goat"
1973	A Picture of Katherine Mansfield	Harry	Episode "#1.5"
1973	Special Branch	Muller	Episode: "Hostage"
1973	Arthur of the Britons	Roland	Episode: "The Prisoner"
1973	Six Days of Justice	Mr. Golding	Episode: "Stranger in Paradise"
1973	ITV Saturday Night Theatre	Brother Kevin	Episode: "Catholics"
1973	Orson Welles Great Mysteries	Major Rolfe	Episode: "An Affair of Honour"
1974	Zodiac	Reuben Keiser	Episode: "The Cool Aquarian"
1974	Masquerade	Stewart	Episode: "May We Come In?"
1975	The Secret Agent	Tom Ossipon	Television Movie, BBC
1976	Centre Play	Edith Harrison	Episode: "In the Labyrinth"
1972–1976	Play for Today	Various characters	3 episodes, including The Other Woman
1977	ITV Sunday Night Drama	Various characters	2 episodes
1978	Premiere	Kenny	Episode: "One of These Nights I'm Gonna Get an Early Day"
1977–1979	The Other One	Brian Bryant	13 episodes
1980	Tales of the Unexpected	Andrew	Episode: "The Umbrella Man"
1982	ITV Playhouse	Unknown	Episode: "The Breadwinner"
1982	La ronde	Unknown	Television movie, BBC
1985	Absurd Person Singular	Geoffrey Jackson	Television movie, BBC
1985	Oscar	Oscar Wilde	TV miniseries
1985	Tropical Moon Over Dorking	Bill	Television movie, BBC
1986	The Singing Detective	Philip Marlowe	6 episodes
1987	Bergerac	Jarvis McLeod	Episode: "Winner Takes All"
1987	Theatre Night	Pastor Manders	Episode: Ghosts
1988	Mountain Language	Sergeant	Television Movie, BBC
1989	The Heat of the Day	Harrison	TV movie
1989	The Jim Henson Hour	Ultragorgon (voice)	Episode: Monster Maker
1989	About Face	Trevor	Episode: "Searching for Señor Duende"
1990	Blood Royal: William the Conqueror	William I	TV movie
1991	The Storyteller: Greek Myths	The Storyteller	4 episodes
1991	Minder	Tommy Hanbury	Episode: "Guess Who's Coming to Pinner?"
1992–1993	Maigret	Insp. Maigret	12 episodes
1993	Performance	Archie Rice	Episode: "The Entertainer"
1994	Faith	Peter John Moreton	TV miniseries
1995	The Wind in the Willows	Badger (voice)	Television movie
1996	Expert Witness	Presenter / Narrator	
1996	Samson and Delilah	King Hanun	TV miniseries
1996	The Willows in Winter	Badger (voice)	Television movie
1999	Wives and Daughters	Squire Hamley	TV miniseries, BBC
2000	Longitude	John Harrison	Television movie, A&E
2000	Endgame	Hamm	Television Movie, BBC
2001	Perfect Strangers	Raymond	Miniseries, BBC
2002	Path to War	Lyndon B. Johnson	Television Movie, HBO
2002	Top Gear	Guest	Series 1: episode 8
2003	The Lost Prince	Edward VII	TV movie, BBC
2003	Angels in America	Prior Walter Ancestor	TV Miniseries, HBO
2006	Top Gear	Guest	Series 8: episode 5
2006	Celebration	Lambert	TV movie
2007	Joe's Palace	Elliot Graham	Television movie, BBC
2007	Cranford	Mr. Holbrook	2 episodes
2009	Kröd Mändoon and the Flaming Sword of Fire	The Narrator	Episode: "Wench Trouble"
2009	Emma	Mr. Woodhouse	TV miniseries
2010	Doctor Who	Kazran / Elliot Sardick	Christmas special: "A Christmas Carol"
2011	Comic Relief: Uptown Downstairs Abbey	Narrator	Uncredited
2011	Page Eight	Benedict Baron	TV movie, PBS
2012	Luck	Michael "Mike" Smythe	Miniseries, HBO
2012	Restless	Baron Mansfield	Miniseries, PBS
2013	National Theatre Live: 50 Years On Stage	Himself	Live special; PBS
2013	Lucan	Older John Burke	Miniseries, ITV
2014	Quirke	Judge Garret Griffin	3 episodes
2014	Common	Judge	TV movie, BBC
2014	On Angel Wings	Grandfather (voice)	Short
2015	The Casual Vacancy	Howard Mollison	Mini-series, HBO
2016	Churchill's Secret	Winston Churchill	TV movie, PBS
2016	The Hollow Crown: Henry VI, Part I	Mortimer	Miniseries, BBC
2016	The Nightmare Worlds of H. G. Wells	Egbert Elvesham	Miniseries, Sky Arts
2017	Fearless	Sir Alastair McKinnon	Miniseries, ITV
2017	Little Women	Mr. Laurence	TV miniseries, PBS
2015–2018	Fortitude	Henry Tyson	10 episodes

== Theatre ==
Year	Title	Role	Venue
1962	Othello	Second Gentleman	Gate Theatre, Dublin
1963	Hamlet	Spear Carrier	National Theatre, The Old Vic
1963	Saint Joan	Extra	National Theatre, The Old Vic
1963	The Recruiting Officer	Servant	National Theatre, The Old Vic
1964	Andorra	Extra	National Theatre, The Old Vic
1964	Othello	Extra	National Theatre, The Old Vic
1964	Philoctetes	Chorus	National Theatre, The Old Vic
1964	The Royal Hunt of the Sun	Diego	National Theatre, The Old Vic
1965	The Crucible	Herrick	National Theatre, The Old Vic
1965	Mother Courage and Her Children	Eilif	National Theatre, The Old Vic
1965	Love for Love	Snap	National Theatre, The Old Vic
1966	Juno and the Paycock	Jerry Devine	National Theatre, The Old Vic
1966	The Storm	Extra	National Theatre, The Old Vic
1967	Events While Guarding the Bofors Gun	Flynn	Birmingham Repertory Theatre
1967	A Severed Head	Palmer Anderson	Birmingham Repertory Theatre
1967	The Doctor's Dilemma	Patrick Cullen	Birmingham Repertory Theatre
1967	Saint Joan	Cauchon	Birmingham Repertory Theatre
1968	Peer Gynt	The Button Moulder	Birmingham Repertory Theatre
1968	Othello	Othello	Birmingham Repertory Theatre
1968	Macbeth	Macbeth	Forum Theatre, Billingham
1969	In Celebration	Andrew	Liverpool Playhouse
1969	Coriolanus	Coriolanus	Liverpool Playhouse
1970	The Plebeians Rehearse the Uprising	Wiebe	Royal Shakespeare Company, Aldwych Theatre
1970	Major Barbara	Charles Lomax	Royal Shakespeare Company, Aldwych Theatre
1971	Henry VIII	Surrey	Royal Shakespeare Company, Aldwych Theatre
1971	When Thou Art King	Hotspur	Roundhouse (RSC)
1972	The Brass Hat	Guy Holden	Yvonne Arnaud Theatre, Guildford
1973	Not Drowning But Waving	Robin	Greenwich Theatre
1974	The Norman Conquests	Tom	Greenwich Theatre
1975	The Norman Conquests	Tom	Globe Theatre
1975	The Zoo Story	Gerry	Regent's Park Open Air Theatre
1976	Otherwise Engaged	Simon	Queen's Theatre
1977	Just Between Ourselves	Neil	Queen's Theatre
1978	Alice's Boys	Bertie	Savoy Theatre
1978	Betrayal	Jerry	Olivier Theatre (NT)
1979	Close of Play	Henry	Lyttelton Theatre (NT)
1979	Richard III	Buckingham	Olivier Theatre (NT)
1980	Othello	Roderigo	Olivier Theatre (NT)
1980	Sisterly Feelings	Patrick	Olivier Theatre (NT)
1980	The Life of Galileo	Galileo	Olivier Theatre (NT)
1981	Much Ado About Nothing	Benedick	Olivier Theatre (NT)
1982	King Lear	King Lear	Royal Shakespeare Theatre (RSC)
1983	King Lear	King Lear	Barbican Theatre (RSC)
1983	Antony and Cleopatra	Antony	Barbican Theatre (RSC)
1983	Tales from Hollywood	Ödön von Horváth	Olivier Theatre (NT)
1985	Old Times	Deeley	Theatre Royal Haymarket
1985	A Chorus of Disapproval	Dafydd ap Llewellyn	Olivier Theatre (NT)
1986	Tons of Money	Sprules	Lyttelton Theatre (NT)
1987	A View from the Bridge	Eddie Carbone	Cottesloe Theatre (NT)
1987	A Small Family Business	Jack McCracken	Olivier Theatre (NT)
1988	Mountain Language	Sergeant	Lyttelton Theatre (NT)
1988	Uncle Vanya	Uncle Vanya	Vaudeville Theatre
1989	Veterans Day	Walter Kercelik	Theatre Royal Haymarket
1990	Man of the Moment	Douglas Beechey	Globe Theatre
1991	Othello	Othello	Stephen Joseph Theatre, Scarborough
1991	Taking Steps	Roland	Stephen Joseph Theatre, Scarborough
1995	Volpone	Volpone	Olivier Theatre (NT)
1995	Skylight	Tom Sergeant	Cottesloe Theatre (NT)
1996	Skylight	Tom Sergeant	Wyndham's Theatre
1996	Skylight	Tom Sergeant	Royale Theatre, New York City
1997	Tom and Clem	Tom Driberg	Aldwych Theatre
1998	The Unexpected Man	The Man	The Pit (RSC)/Duchess Theatre
1999	Cressida	John Shank	Albery Theatre
1999	Juno and the Paycock	Captain Jack Boyle	Gaiety Theatre, Dublin
2000	The Caretaker	Davies	Comedy Theatre
2002	A Number	The Father	Royal Court Theatre
2004	Endgame	Hamm	Albery Theatre
2005	Henry IV, Part 1 and Henry IV, Part 2	Falstaff	Olivier Theatre (NT)
2005	Celebration	Lambert	Gate Theatre, Dublin/Albery Theatre (staged reading)
2006	Eh Joe	Joe	Gate Theatre/Duke of York's Theatre
2008	No Man's Land	Hirst	Gate Theatre/Duke of York's Theatre
2010	Krapp's Last Tape	Krapp	Gate Theatre/Duchess Theatre
2012	All That Fall	Dan Rooney	Jermyn Street Theatre/Arts Theatre
2013	All That Fall	Dan Rooney	59E59 Theatres, New York City
2013	Eh Joe	Joe	Royal Lyceum Theatre, Edinburgh
2014	Eh Joe	Joe	Schiller Theater, Berlin
2018	Pinter One	The Guard (voice)	Harold Pinter Theatre

== Radio ==
Year	Title	Role	Director	Station
1990	Betrayal	Jerry	Ned Chaillet	BBC Radio 3
2006	Embers	Henry	Stephen Rea	BBC Radio 3 Drama on 3
2007	The Homecoming	Sam	Thea Sharrock	BBC Radio 3 Drama on 3

== Video games ==
Year	Title	Voice role
2003	Ghosthunter	Lord William Hawksmoor
2014	The Elder Scrolls Online	The Prophet / Varen Aquilarios
2018	Harry Potter: Hogwarts Mystery	Professor Albus Dumbledore

== Theme park attractions ==
Year	Title	Voice role
2010	Harry Potter and the Forbidden Journey	Professor Albus Dumbledore

== CDs ==
- Vivaldi – The Four Seasons – Music and Sonnetts (2011) – Michael Gambon, Robert Atchison and the Altamira Chamber Orchestra
