= List of HBO Films films =

This is a list of films produced and distributed by HBO Films.

== 1980s ==
Release date	Title	Notes
July 22, 1982	The Deadly Game	distribution only
May 22, 1983	The Terry Fox Story	HBO's first television film
August 28, 1983	Mr. Halpern and Mr. Johnson	
September 11, 1983	Between Friends	
November 21, 1983	Right of Way	distribution only
February 12, 1984	To Catch a King	distribution only
March 24, 1984	The Cold Room	distribution only
April 22, 1984	The Far Pavilions	distribution only
June 20, 1984	Sakharov	distribution only
July 15, 1984	Draw!	distribution only; produced by The Bryna Company and Astral Film Productions
August 25, 1984	The Blood of Others	distribution only
August 31, 1984	Flashpoint	HBO's first theatrical film; distributed by TriStar Pictures
October 14, 1984	Countdown to Looking Glass	
October 20, 1984	The Guardian	
November 18, 1984	The Glitter Dome	
December 14, 1984	A Passage to India	distributed by Columbia Pictures
January 13, 1985	Gulag	co-production with Lorimar Television
February 8, 1985	Heaven Help Us	distributed by TriStar Pictures
February 24, 1985	Finnegan Begin Again	
March 30, 1985	Forbidden	co-production with Telepictures
May 12, 1985	Reunion at Fairborough	distributed by Columbia Pictures Television
July 28, 1985	Blackout	distribution only
August 16, 1985	Volunteers	distributed by TriStar Pictures
September 8, 1985	Mussolini: The Decline and Fall of Il Duce	co-produced with RAI
October 4, 1985	Sweet Dreams	distributed by TriStar Pictures
October 6, 1985	The Park Is Mine	distributed by 20th Century Fox
November 24, 1985	Fortress	
December 29, 1985	Head Office	distributed by TriStar Pictures
January 19, 1986	Murrow	distribution only
February 21, 1986	The Hitcher	distributed by TriStar Pictures
March 1986	Odd Jobs	distributed by TriStar Pictures
April 20, 1986	Act of Vengeance	co-production with Lorimar-Telepictures
May 18, 1986	As Summers Die	
July 20, 1986	Half A Lifetime	HBO Showcase's first film
July 27, 1986	Apology	
September 7, 1986	Yuri Nosenko, KGB	
October 26, 1986	Florida Straits	
November 29, 1986	Sword of Gideon	distribution only
December 12, 1986	Three Amigos	distributed by Orion Pictures
February 6, 1987	Light of Day	distributed by TriStar Pictures
February 14, 1987	Control	distribution only
February 28, 1987	The Quick and the Dead	
April 19, 1987	The Last Innocent Man	
May 16, 1987	Conspiracy: The Trial of the Chicago 8	distribution only
May 23, 1987	Long Gone	
June 28, 1987	The Lion of Africa	
August 14, 1987	The Monster Squad	distributed by TriStar Pictures
August 29, 1987	Vietnam War Story	
September 20, 1987	Mandela	distribution only
October 5, 1987	Intimate Contact	distribution only
October 31, 1987	The Man Who Broke 1,000 Chains	
November 13, 1987	The Running Man	distributed by TriStar Pictures
November 15, 1987	Laguna Heat	
November 28, 1987	The Impossible Spy	distribution only
December 4, 1987	The Trouble with Spies	distributed by De Laurentiis Entertainment Group
December 18, 1987	Ironweed	distributed by TriStar Pictures
December 26, 1987	Into the Homeland	
February 20, 1988	Baja Oklahoma	
March 26, 1988	The Tracker	
April 8, 1988	Steal the Sky	
May 28, 1988	Clinton and Nadine	distribution only
June 5, 1988	Waldheim: A Commission of Inquiry	
August 14, 1988	Tidy Endings	
October 17, 1988	Lip Service	
November 27, 1988	A Dangerous Life	
December 12, 1988	The Christmas Wife	distribution only
December 18, 1988	Dead Solid Perfect	
March 12, 1989	Dead Man Out	
April 23, 1989	Murderers Among Us: The Simon Wiesenthal Story	
May 28, 1989	Third Degree Burn	
June 25, 1989	Traveling Man	
July 30, 1989	Time Flies When You're Alive	
August 16, 1989	Rude Awakening	distributed by Orion Pictures
August 20, 1989	Tailspin: Behind the Korean Airliner Tragedy	
September 16, 1989	The Heist	
October 28, 1989	Perfect Witness	
November 25, 1989	Red King, White Knight	
December 16, 1989	Age-Old Friends	

== 1990s ==
Release date	Title	Notes
January 27, 1990	The Image	
February 19, 1990	Montana	
March 4, 1990	Fellow Traveller	
April 22, 1990	The Investigation: Inside a Terrorist Bombing	distribution only
May 19, 1990	By Dawn's Early Light	
June 24, 1990	Framed	
July 22, 1990	El Diablo	
August 2, 1990	Hometown Boy Makes Good	
August 19, 1990	Women & Men: Stories of Seduction	distributed by Warner Bros.
September 8, 1990	Criminal Justice	
September 9, 1990	Somebody Has to Shoot the Picture	distributed by MCA TV
October 13, 1990	Judgment	
November 25, 1990	Descending Angel	
December 9, 1990	The Tragedy of Flight 103: The Inside Story	
January 26, 1991	Prison Stories: Women on the Inside	
February 1, 1991	Off and Running	set to be distributed by Orion Pictures before the company hit bankruptcy
March 16, 1991	The Josephine Baker Story	
April 20, 1991	One Man's War	
May 10, 1991	Switch	distributed by Warner Bros.
May 11, 1991	Fever	
June 7, 1991	Don't Tell Mom the Babysitter's Dead	distributed by Warner Bros.
June 16, 1991	Without Warning: The James Brady Story	
July 20, 1991	Doublecrossed	
August 18, 1991	Women & Men 2	
September 7, 1991	Cast a Deadly Spell	
October 4, 1991	Ricochet	distributed by Warner Bros.
November 2, 1991	Prisoner of Honor	distribution only
December 10, 1991	Wedlock	distribution only
February 29, 1992	For Richer, for Poorer	
March 28, 1992	The Last of His Tribe	
May 30, 1992	Afterburn	
June 4, 1992	Stepfather III	distribution only
June 20, 1992	A Private Matter	
July 11, 1992	The Comrades of Summer	
July 17, 1992	Missing Pieces	set to be distributed by Orion Pictures before the company hit bankruptcy
July 24, 1992	Mom and Dad Save the World	distributed by Warner Bros.
August 22, 1992	Citizen Cohn	
September 12, 1992	Teamster Boss: The Jackie Presser Story	
October 4, 1992	Running Mates	
November 21, 1992	Stalin	
December 12, 1992	Dead Ahead: The Exxon Valdez Disaster	
January 30, 1993	Blind Side	
February 20, 1993	Hostages	
March 20, 1993	Barbarians at the Gate	
April 10, 1993	The Positively True Adventures of the Alleged Texas Cheerleader-Murdering Mom	
May 8, 1993	Daybreak	
July 31, 1993	Blue Ice	
August 21, 1993	Strapped	
September 11, 1993	And the Band Played On	
October 30, 1993	The Last Outlaw	
November 27, 1993	Full Eclipse	
December 11, 1993	Attack of the 50 Ft. Woman	
February 12, 1994	State of Emergency	
March 26, 1994	Against the Wall	
May 21, 1994	White Mile	
June 25, 1994	Blind Justice	
July 23, 1994	Doomsday Gun	
August 20, 1994	The Enemy Within	
September 17, 1994	The Burning Season	
November 26, 1994	Fatherland	
December 10, 1994	Witch Hunt	
February 25, 1995	Citizen X	
March 18, 1995	In Pursuit of Honor	
April 20, 1995	Tyson	
May 20, 1995	Indictment: The McMartin Trial	
May 21, 1995	Above Suspicion	
May 25, 1995	Cafe Society	developed in association with HBO Showcase
June 24, 1995	The Infiltrator	HBO Showcase's final film
July 22, 1995	Body Language	
August 26, 1995	The Tuskegee Airmen	
September 9, 1995	Truman	
October 14, 1995	The Affair	
November 25, 1995	Sugartime	
February 17, 1996	America's Dream	
February 24, 1996	The Late Shift	
March 23, 1996	Rasputin: Dark Servant of Destiny	
April 20, 1996	Soul of the Game	
May 18, 1996	Norma Jean & Marilyn	
June 15, 1996	Deadly Voyage	HBO NYC Productions' first film
June 30, 1996	Grand Avenue	
July 13, 1996	Don't Look Back	
August 17, 1996	Gotti	
September 14, 1996	Crime of the Century	
October 13, 1996	If These Walls Could Talk	
November 2, 1996	Mistrial	
November 23, 1996	Rebound: The Legend of Earl "The Goat" Manigault	
December 14, 1996	The Cherokee Kid	
January 11, 1997	Dead Silence	
February 22, 1997	Miss Evers' Boys	
March 15, 1997	The Second Civil War	
April 20, 1997	In the Gloaming	
May 17, 1997	Weapons of Mass Distraction	
June 14, 1997	Path to Paradise: The Untold Story of the World Trade Center Bombing	
July 26, 1997	Hostile Waters	
August 17, 1997	Subway Stories	
September 6, 1997	First Time Felon	
November 15, 1997	Don King: Only in America	
December 10, 1997	Amistad	distributed by DreamWorks Pictures
December 13, 1997	Breast Men	
January 31, 1998	Gia	
February 28, 1998	The Pentagon Wars	
March 21, 1998	Always Outnumbered	
May 30, 1998	A Bright Shining Lie	
June 20, 1998	Ambushed	
June 27, 1998	When Trumpets Fade	
July 25, 1998	Poodle Springs	
August 22, 1998	The Rat Pack	
September 18, 1998	Black Cat Run	
October 4, 1998	Shot Through the Heart	
October 13, 1998	Butter	
November 21, 1998	Winchell	
February 27, 1999	Lansky	
March 20, 1999	Earthly Possessions	
April 17, 1999	The Jack Bull	
May 22, 1999	A Lesson Before Dying	
June 11, 1999	Made Men	
July 3, 1999	Vendetta	
August 21, 1999	Introducing Dorothy Dandridge	
September 14, 1999	The Sissy Duckling	
October 16, 1999	Excellent Cadavers	
November 20, 1999	RKO 281	HBO Pictures' final film before merge with HBO NYC
December 11, 1999	Witness Protection	HBO NYC Productions' final film before merge with HBO Pictures

== 2000s ==
Release date	Title	Notes
February 24, 2000	Dancing in September	HBO Films' first film
March 5, 2000	If These Walls Could Talk 2	
May 20, 2000	Cheaters	
August 26, 2000	The Last of the Blonde Bombshells	
October 18, 2000	For Love or Country: The Arturo Sandoval Story	
December 9, 2000	Disappearing Acts	
February 24, 2001	Boycott	
March 24, 2001	Wit	
April 28, 2001	61*	
May 29, 2001	Conspiracy	
June 23, 2001	Stranger Inside	
August 11, 2001	Dinner with Friends	
October 13, 2001	Shot in the Heart	
November 27, 2001	Pretty When You Cry	
March 9, 2002	The Laramie Project	
April 19, 2002	My Big Fat Greek Wedding	distributed by IFC Films
April 27, 2002	The Gathering Storm	co-produced with BBC Films
May 18, 2002	Path to War	
June 22, 2002	Point of Origin	
August 21, 2002	Hysterical Blindness	
October 18, 2002	Real Women Have Curves	distributed by Newmarket Films
December 7, 2002	Live from Baghdad	
March 16, 2003	Normal	
May 25, 2003	My House in Umbria	
July 26, 2003	Undefeated	
August 15, 2003	American Splendor	distributed by Fine Line Features
September 7, 2003	And Starring Pancho Villa as Himself	
September 10, 2003	The Photographer	
October 24, 2003	Elephant	distributed by Fine Line Features
January 18, 2004	Everyday People	
February 15, 2004	Iron Jawed Angels	
April 27, 2004	Strip Search	
May 30, 2004	Something the Lord Made	
July 16, 2004	Maria Full of Grace	distributed by Fine Line Features
September 3, 2004	Yesterday	
December 5, 2004	The Life and Death of Peter Sellers	
January 24, 2005	Dirty War	co-produced with BBC Films
February 12, 2005	Lackawanna Blues	
February 17, 2005	Sometimes in April	
April 29, 2005	The Holy Girl	distributed by Fine Line Features
April 30, 2005	Warm Springs	
June 24, 2005	The Girl in the Café	
July 9, 2005	Red Dust	American distribution only; produced by BBC Films
July 22, 2005	Last Days	distributed by Picturehouse
September 15, 2005	Angel Rodriguez	
September 16, 2005	Mrs. Harris	
March 18, 2006	Walkout	
May 5, 2006	The Notorious Bettie Page	distributed by Picturehouse
August 25, 2006	Idlewild	distributed by Universal Pictures
January 26, 2007	Life Support	
February 17, 2007	Longford	
February 23, 2007	Starter for 10	distributed by Picturehouse
May 27, 2007	Bury My Heart at Wounded Knee	
June 13, 2007	The Fever	
August 10, 2007	Rocket Science	distributed by Picturehouse
August 21, 2007	As You Like It	
September 11, 2007	Pinochet's Last Stand	co-produced with BBC Films
September 27, 2007	Stuart: A Life Backwards	co-produced with BBC Films
November 4, 2007	Joe's Palace	co-produced with BBC Films
November 8, 2007	The Deal	co-produced with BBC Films
November 12, 2007	Capturing Mary	co-produced with BBC Films
November 17, 2007	Pu-239	
February 9, 2008	Bernard and Doris	
May 25, 2008	Recount	
May 30, 2008	Sex and the City	distributed by New Line Cinema
June 20, 2008	Kit Kittredge: An American Girl	distributed by Picturehouse
August 27, 2008	My Zinc Bed	
September 10, 2008	A Number	
November 22, 2008	Einstein and Eddington	
February 21, 2009	Taking Chance	
April 3, 2009	Sugar	distributed by Sony Pictures Classics
April 18, 2009	Grey Gardens	
April 24, 2009	Frequently Asked Questions About Time Travel	co-produced with BBC Films
May 31, 2009	Into the Storm	co-produced with BBC Films
September 3, 2009	A Dog Year	
October 9, 2009	Good Hair	distributed by Roadside Attractions

== 2010s ==
Release date	Title	Notes
February 6, 2010	Temple Grandin	
April 24, 2010	You Don't Know Jack	
May 27, 2010	Sex and the City 2	co-produced with New Line Cinema; distributed by Warner Bros.
May 29, 2010	The Special Relationship	
February 12, 2011	The Sunset Limited	
April 23, 2011	Cinema Verite	
May 23, 2011	Too Big to Fail	
March 10, 2012	Game Change	
May 28, 2012	Hemingway & Gellhorn	
October 20, 2012	The Girl	
March 24, 2013	Phil Spector	
April 20, 2013	Mary and Martha	
May 26, 2013	Behind the Candelabra	
August 10, 2013	Clear History	
October 5, 2013	Muhammad Ali's Greatest Fight	
May 25, 2014	The Normal Heart	
May 16, 2015	Bessie	
May 29, 2015	Nightingale	
June 3, 2015	Entourage	distributed by Warner Bros.
July 11, 2015	7 Days in Hell	
November 2, 2015	The Leisure Class	
March 25, 2016	My Big Fat Greek Wedding 2	distributed by Universal Pictures
April 16, 2016	Confirmation	
April 23, 2016	Beyoncé: Lemonade	
May 21, 2016	All the Way	
April 22, 2017	The Immortal Life of Henrietta Lacks	
May 20, 2017	The Wizard of Lies	
July 8, 2017	Tour de Pharmacy	
April 7, 2018	Paterno	
May 19, 2018	Fahrenheit 451	
May 26, 2018	The Tale	
October 20, 2018	My Dinner with Hervé	
November 15, 2018	The Emperor's Newest Clothes	
December 7, 2018	Icebox	
January 21, 2019	Brexit	co-produced with Channel 4
February 3, 2019	O.G.	
April 6, 2019	Native Son	distribution only; produced by A24
May 31, 2019	Deadwood: The Movie	
July 27, 2019	Share	distribution only; produced by A24

== 2020s ==
Release date	Title	Notes
April 25, 2020	Bad Education	
September 12, 2020	Coastal Elites	
May 29, 2021	Oslo	co-produced with DreamWorks Pictures
October 1, 2021	The Many Saints of Newark	co-produced with New Line Cinema; distributed by Warner Bros. Pictures
April 27, 2022	The Survivor	
May 29, 2023	Reality	
September 8, 2023	My Big Fat Greek Wedding 3	distributed by Focus Features
September 18, 2023	Chico Virtual	short film
May 31, 2024	The Great Lillian Hall	
May 31, 2025	Mountainhead	
May 29, 2026	Miss You, Love You	
