= Michael Gambon =

Irish-English actor (1940–2023)

Sir Michael Gambon CBE
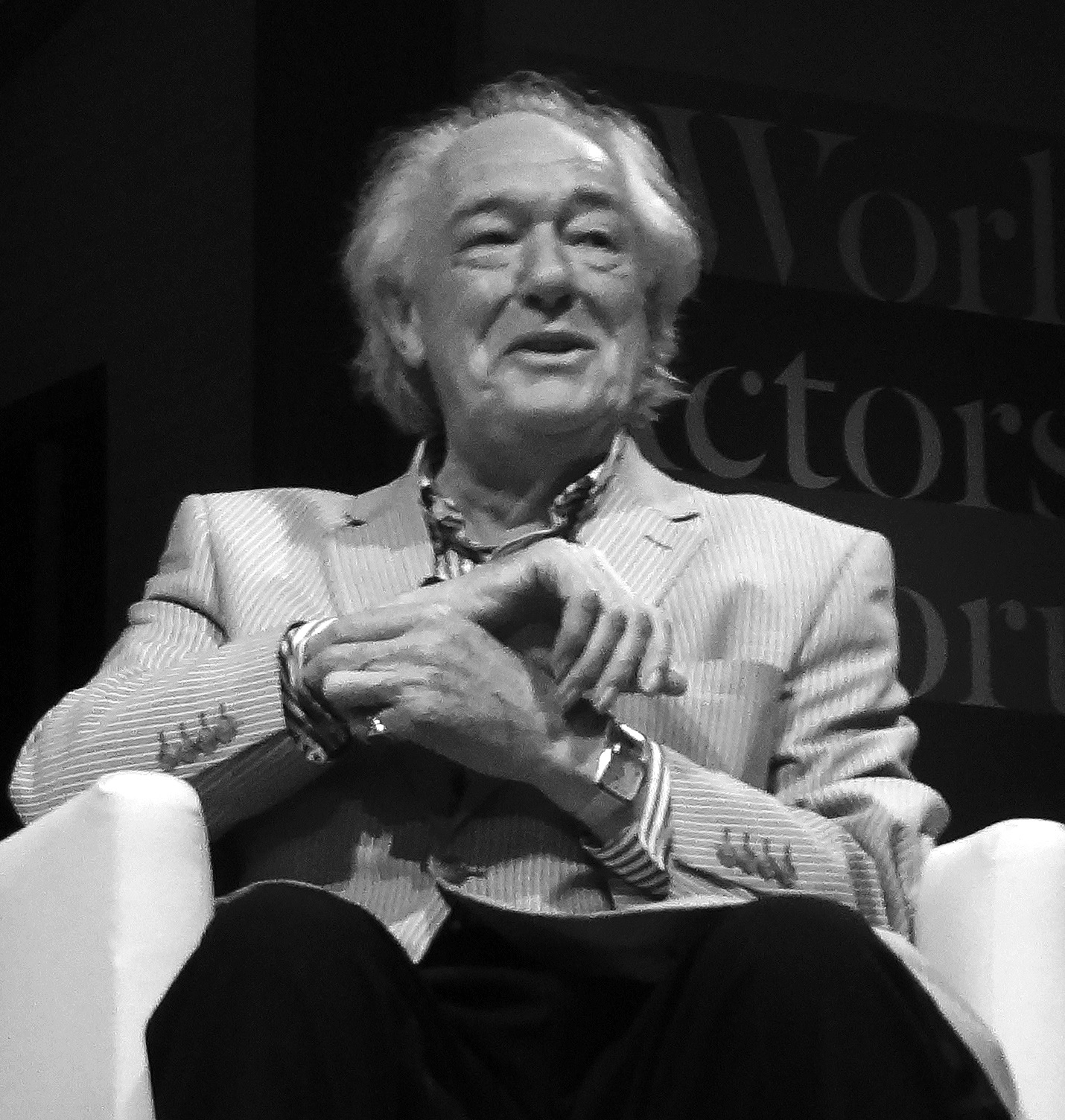
- Gambon in 2013
- Born: Michael John Gambon; 19 October 1940; Cabra, Dublin, Ireland
- Died: 27 September 2023 (aged 82); Witham, Essex, England
- Citizenship: Ireland; United Kingdom
- Occupation: Actor
- Years active: 1962–2019
- Works: Full list
- Spouse: Anne Miller (m. 1962)
- Partner: Philippa Hart (2000–2023; his death)
- Children: 3
- Awards: Full list

Sir Michael John Gambon (/ˈɡæmbɒn/ GAM-bon; 19 October 1940 – 27 September 2023) was an Irish-English actor. Gambon started his acting career with Laurence Olivier as one of the original members of the Royal National Theatre. Over his six-decade-long career, he received three Olivier Awards, four BAFTA TV Awards and two Screen Actors Guild Awards. In 1998, he was knighted by Queen Elizabeth II for services to drama.

Gambon appeared in many productions of works by William Shakespeare such as Othello, Hamlet, Macbeth and Coriolanus. Gambon was nominated for thirteen Olivier Awards, winning three times for A Chorus of Disapproval (1985), A View from the Bridge (1987) and Man of the Moment (1990). In 1997, Gambon made his Broadway debut in David Hare's Skylight, earning a Tony Award for Best Actor in a Play nomination.

Gambon made his film debut in Othello (1965). His other notable films include The Cook, the Thief, His Wife & Her Lover (1989), Toys (1992), The Wings of the Dove (1997), The Insider (1999), Gosford Park (2001), Amazing Grace (2006), The King's Speech (2010), Quartet (2012) and Victoria & Abdul (2017). He also acted in the Wes Anderson films The Life Aquatic with Steve Zissou (2004) and Fantastic Mr. Fox (2009). He gained wider recognition through his role of Albus Dumbledore in the Harry Potter film series from 2004 to 2011, replacing Richard Harris following his death in 2002.

For his work on television, Gambon received four BAFTA Awards for The Singing Detective (1986), Wives and Daughters (1999), Longitude (2000) and Perfect Strangers (2001). Gambon and Robbie Coltrane are the only actors to have won this award three consecutive times. He also received two Primetime Emmy Award nominations, for Path to War (2002) and Emma (2009). Gambon's other notable projects include Cranford (2007), and The Casual Vacancy (2015). In 2017, he received the Irish Film & Television Academy Lifetime Achievement Award. In 2020, he was listed at No. 28 on The Irish Times's list of Ireland's greatest film actors.

== Early life ==
Michael John Gambon was born in the Cabra suburb of Dublin on 19 October 1940. His mother, Mary (née Hoare), was a seamstress, while his father, Edward Gambon, was an engineering operative during World War II. His father decided to seek work in the rebuilding of London, and moved the family to Mornington Crescent in London's Camden borough when Gambon was six. His father arranged for him to be registered as a British subject, a decision that would later allow him to receive a substantive (rather than honorary) knighthood. (Note: Under the British Nationality Act 1981, anyone born in Ireland before 1949 can still register as a British subject and, after five years' UK residence, become a British citizen.) Brought up as a strict Roman Catholic, Gambon attended St Aloysius Boys' School in Somers Town and served at the altar. He went on from there to St Aloysius' College in Highgate, whose former pupils include the actor Peter Sellers. The family later moved to North End, Kent, where he attended Crayford Secondary School but left with no qualifications at the age of 15.

After leaving school, at the age of 16 Gambon gained an apprenticeship as a toolmaker with Vickers-Armstrongs. By the time he was 21, he was a qualified engineering technician and kept the job for a further year. He acquired a lifelong passion for collecting antique guns, clocks, watches and classic cars.

== Career ==
=== 1960–1979: Stage debut and National Theatre ===
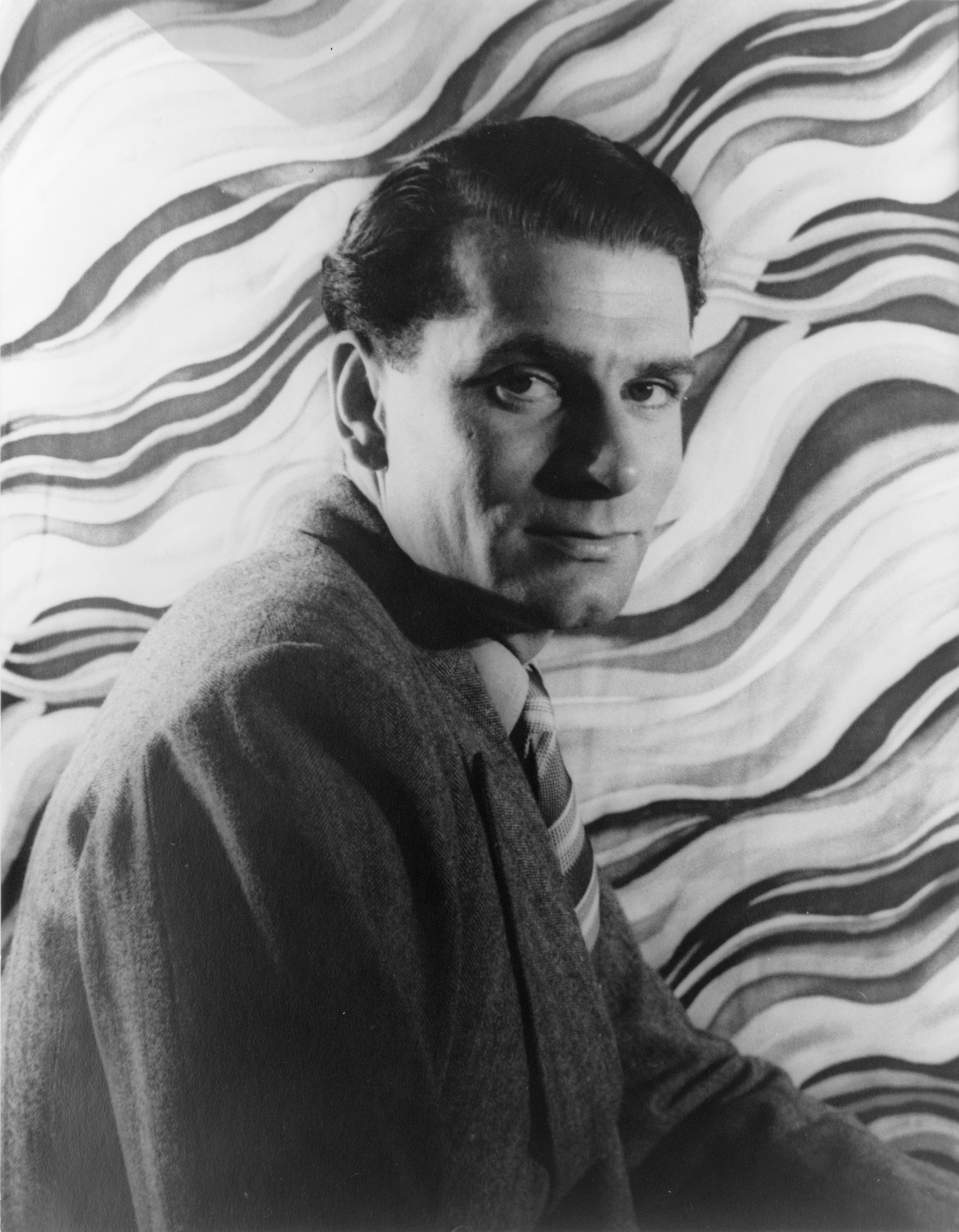
Laurence Olivier, the first artistic director of the National Theatre in 1963, was a mentor to Gambon.

At age 24, Gambon wrote a letter to Micheál Mac Liammóir, the Irish theatre impresario who ran Dublin's Gate Theatre, accompanied by a CV describing a rich and wholly imaginary theatre career: he was taken on. Gambon made his professional stage debut in the Gate Theatre's 1962 production of Othello, playing "Second Gentleman", followed by a European tour. A year later, auditioning with the opening soliloquy from Richard III, he caught the eye of Laurence Olivier who was recruiting promising actors for his new National Theatre Company. Gambon, along with Robert Stephens, Derek Jacobi and Frank Finlay, was hired as one of the "to be renowned" and played any number of small roles, appearing on cast lists as "Mike Gambon". The company initially performed at the Old Vic, their first production being Hamlet, directed by Olivier and starring Peter O'Toole. Gambon played for four years in many NT productions, including named roles in The Recruiting Officer and The Royal Hunt of the Sun, working with directors William Gaskill and John Dexter.

Gambon made his film debut in Laurence Olivier's Othello alongside Maggie Smith and Derek Jacobi in 1965. After three years at the Old Vic, Olivier advised Gambon to gain experience in provincial rep. In 1967, he left the National Theatre for the Birmingham Repertory Company, which was to give him his first crack at the title roles in Othello (his favourite), Macbeth and Coriolanus. In 1967, he made his television debut in the BBC television adaptation of Much Ado About Nothing as Watchman No. 4. He also appeared in British programmes such as Softly, Softly (1967) and Public Eye (1968). From 1968 to 1970, he featured in the BBC historical series The Borderers as Gavin Kerr. He also had a recurring role in the Canadian series The Challengers (1972). He also appeared in drama anthology series including Play for Today, Play of the Month and ITV Playhouse.

In 1974, Eric Thompson cast him as the melancholy vet in Alan Ayckbourn's The Norman Conquests at Greenwich. A speedy transfer to the West End established him as a comic actor, squatting at a crowded dining table on a tiny chair and agonising over a choice between black or white coffee. Back at the National, now on the South Bank, his next turning point was Peter Hall's premiere staging of Harold Pinter's Betrayal, a performance marked by subtlety – a production photograph shows him embracing Penelope Wilton with sensitive hands and long slim fingers (the touch of a master clock-maker). He is also one of the few actors to have mastered the demands of the vast Olivier Theatre. As Simon Callow once said: "Gambon's iron lungs and overwhelming charisma are able to command a sort of operatic full-throatedness which triumphs over hard walls and long distances". After his film debut, Gambon was asked by James Bond producer Cubby Broccoli to audition for the role in 1970, to replace George Lazenby. He acted in the British horror films Nothing But the Night (1973) and The Beast Must Die (1974). The following year he played Tom Ossipon, in the television film The Secret Agent, based on the novel of the same name.

In 1976 he took the part of Lieutenant Commander Rogers in a filmed version of the play French Without Tears by Terence Rattigan, for a TV episode of the series BBC Play of the Month, directed by John Gorrie, with Nicola Pagett, Anthony Andrews, Barbara Kellerman, Tim Woodward and Nigel Havers. Set in a French Villa, the action takes place in a cram school for adults needing to acquire French for business reasons. Scattered throughout are Franglais phrases and schoolboy misunderstandings of the French language.

=== 1980–1994: The Singing Detective and accolades ===
Gambon's powerful voice and presence were to serve him in good stead in John Dexter's masterly staging of The Life of Galileo by Bertolt Brecht at the National Theatre in 1980, the first Brecht play to become a popular success. Hall called him "unsentimental, dangerous and immensely powerful," and The Sunday Times called his performance "a decisive step in the direction of great tragedy... great acting," while fellow actors paid him the rare compliment of applauding him in the dressing room on the first night. In 1985, he appeared in the British drama film Turtle Diary directed by John Irvin with a screenplay adapted by Harold Pinter. The film starred Glenda Jackson and Ben Kingsley.

His craggy looks soon made him into a character actor, a term which Gambon disputed. For his first major lead role in Dennis Potter's The Singing Detective (1986) he won his first British Academy Television Award for Best Actor. He starred as detective Inspector Jules Maigret in an ITV adaptation of twelve of Georges Simenon's books. The National Theatre staged a revival of A View from the Bridge in 1987 at the Cottesloe Theatre. It was directed by Alan Ayckbourn, and Gambon gave an acclaimed performance as Eddie. The Guardian said, "In the first place it shows Michael Gambon shaking hands with greatness." In 1989, Gambon starred in the Peter Greenaway's crime drama The Cook, the Thief, His Wife & Her Lover, which also starred Helen Mirren, Tim Roth and Ciarán Hinds. Gambon played Albert Spica, "The Thief", a violent gangster. The film premiered at the 1989 Toronto International Film Festival. Film critic Roger Ebert of the Chicago Sun-Times praised the performances writing, "Mirren and Gambon are among the most distinguished actors in Britain-they've played many of the principal roles in Shakespeare -- and here they find the resources to not only strip themselves of all their defenses, but to do so convincingly."

In 1990, he played Jerry in Harold Pinter's Betrayal for BBC Radio 3. In 1991, he starred as Tommy Hanbury in an episode of the ITV series Minder called "Look Who's Coming To Pinner". Ralph Richardson dubbed him The Great Gambon, an accolade which stuck, although Gambon dismissed it as a circus slogan. But as Sheridan Morley perceptively remarked in 2000, when reviewing Nicholas Wright's Cressida: "Gambon's eccentricity on stage now begins to rival that of his great mentor Richardson". Also like Richardson, interviews were rarely given and raised more questions than they answered. Gambon was a very private person, a "non-starry star" as Ayckbourn called him. Off-stage he preferred to stay out of the limelight. He won screen acclaim, while his ravaged King Lear at Stratford, while he was still in his early forties, formed a double act with a red-nosed Antony Sher as the Fool sitting on his master's knee like a ventriloquist's doll.

=== 1995–2003: Broadway debut and film roles ===
There were also appearances in Harold Pinter's Old Times at the Haymarket Theatre and Ben Jonson's Volpone and the brutal sergeant in Pinter's Mountain Language. In 1995, Gambon starred in David Hare's Skylight, with Lia Williams, which opened to rave reviews at the National Theatre. The play transferred first to Wyndham's Theatre and then on to Broadway at the Bernard B. Jacobs Theatre for a four-month run which left him in a state of advanced exhaustion. "Skylight was ten times as hard to play as anything I've ever done" he told Michael Owen in the Evening Standard. "I had a great time in New York, but wanted to return." Variety wrote of his performance, "Gambon, an Irishman revered on the London stage, gives his rough-hewn character a grace that goes beyond the physical". For this performance Gambon received his only Tony Award nomination for Best Actor in a Play.

He later starred as Fyodor Dostoyevsky in the Hungarian director Károly Makk's film The Gambler (1997) about the writing of Dostoyevsky's novella The Gambler. In the 1990s he appeared in films such as, Barry Levinson's fantasy comedy Toys (1992), the period drama Dancing at Lughnasa (1998), the action film Plunkett & Macleane (1998), Michael Mann's political drama The Insider (1999) and Tim Burton's gothic horror film Sleepy Hollow (1999). He also appeared in the BBC serial Wives and Daughters (1999) based on the Victorian novel by the same name by Elizabeth Gaskell. He portrayed Squire Hamley and received his second BAFTA Award nomination and win for Best Actor. The New York Times described Gambon's performance as 'Gruff on the outside, with a huge sentimental streak, the country squire is a familiar type, but he makes him seem endearing and fresh.'

During the 2000s, Gambon appeared in several films including Robert Altman's murder mystery ensemble Gosford Park (2001) where he acted alongside Maggie Smith, Helen Mirren, Kristin Scott Thomas, Kelly Macdonald, Emily Watson and Stephen Fry. Gambon portrays Sir William McCordle, the imperious master of Gosford Park who has invited distinguished company for a weekend shooting party before a murder throws everything into chaos. Empire declared the film, "Altman's best movie in years - an astute exploration of British culture that can stand proudly with his satires of American life. Atmospheric, absorbing, amusing and really fun." The film earned the BAFTA Award for Outstanding British Film as well as nominations for six Academy Award including Best Picture. In 2003, he appeared with Robert Duvall and Kevin Costner, playing the principal villain in the Western film Open Range. Gambon was not among the actors to grace Yasmina Reza's 'Art' at Wyndham's. But together with Simon Russell Beale and Alan Bates, he gave a droll radio account of the role of Marc. And for the RSC he shared Reza's two-hander The Unexpected Man with Eileen Atkins, first at The Pit in the Barbican and then at the Duchess Theatre, a production also intended for New York, but finally delayed by other commitments.

In 2001, he played what he described as "'a physically repulsive" Davies in Patrick Marber's revival of Pinter's The Caretaker, but he found the rehearsal period an unhappy experience, and felt that he had let down the author. A year later, playing opposite Daniel Craig, he portrayed the father of a series of cloned sons in Caryl Churchill's A Number at the Royal Court, remembered for a recumbent moment when he smoked a cigarette, the brightly lit spiral of smoke rising against a black backdrop, an effect which he dreamt up during rehearsals. Gambon starred in a made-for-TV adaptation of Samuel Beckett's Endgame (2001) and Perfect Strangers (2001) which together revealed his talent for comedy. Gambon played President Lyndon B. Johnson in the television film Path to War. About his performance The Washington Post said: "Gambon is entirely up to the task of making a larger-than-life icon seem painfully – and in the end, helplessly – human. It is a performance of fire and brimstone". He was nominated for an Emmy Award for Best Actor in a Mini-series or Movie and a Golden Globe Award for Best Actor in a Miniseries or Motion Picture Made for Television.

=== 2004–2011: Harry Potter and acclaim ===
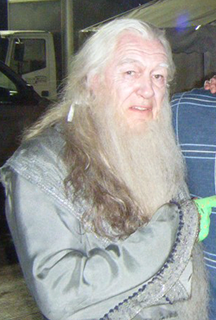
Gambon as Albus Dumbledore on the set of Harry Potter and the Half-Blood Prince in 2008

He played Albus Dumbledore, Hogwarts' headmaster in the third instalment of J. K. Rowling's franchise, Harry Potter and the Prisoner of Azkaban (2004), taking over the role after the death of Richard Harris in 2002; Harris had also played Maigret on television four years before Gambon took that role. Gambon reprised the role of Dumbledore in Harry Potter and the Goblet of Fire (2005), which was released in November 2005 in the United Kingdom and the United States. He returned to the role again in the fifth film, Harry Potter and the Order of the Phoenix (2007) and the sixth film, Harry Potter and the Half-Blood Prince (2009). He appeared in the final two films of the series, Harry Potter and the Deathly Hallows – Part 1 (2010) and Part 2 (2011). Gambon told an interviewer that, when playing Dumbledore, he did not "have to play anyone really. I just stick on a beard and play me, so it's no great feat. I never ease into a role – every part I play is just a variant of my own personality. I'm not really a character actor at all."

In 2004, he appeared in five films, including Wes Anderson's cult comedy The Life Aquatic with Steve Zissou; the British gangster film Layer Cake; and theatrical drama Being Julia. In 2004, Gambon played the lead role (Hamm) in Samuel Beckett's post-apocalyptic play Endgame at the Albery Theatre, London. In 2005, he finally achieved a lifelong ambition to play Falstaff, in Nicholas Hytner's National production of Henry IV, Parts 1 and 2, co-starring with Matthew Macfadyen as Prince Hal. Michael Billington in The Guardian wrote that Gambon's Falstaff "conveyed a growing sense of age, decrepitude and melancholy". In 2006, Gambon performed voiceover for a series of Guinness advertisements featuring penguins. Also in 2006, he performed as Joe in Beckett's Eh Joe, giving two performances a night at the Duke of York's Theatre in London. That same year, he played Henry in Stephen Rea's play about Samuel Beckett's Embers for Radio 3. In 2007, he was Sam in Harold Pinter's The Homecoming for Radio 3.

In 2007, Gambon portrayed Lord Charles Fox in Michael Apted's historical drama Amazing Grace alongside Ioan Gruffudd, Romola Garai, Benedict Cumberbatch, Albert Finney and Rufus Sewell. The film focuses on William Wilberforce, who led the campaign against the slave trade in the British Empire. The film is highly rated according to Rotten Tomatoes with critics' consensus describing it as "your quintessential historical biopic: stately, noble, and with plenty of electrifying performances". That same year, he played major roles in the acclaimed BBC five-part adaptation of Mrs Gaskell's Cranford novels alongside Judi Dench and Imelda Staunton, and in Stephen Poliakoff's Joe's Palace. In 2008, Gambon appeared in the role of Hirst in No Man's Land by Harold Pinter in the Gate Theatre, Dublin, opposite David Bradley as Spooner, in a production directed by Rupert Goold, which transferred to the London West End's Duke of York's Theatre, for which both roles each received nominations for the 2009 Laurence Olivier Award for Best Actor. After Pinter's death on 24 December 2008, Gambon read Hirst's monologue selected by the playwright for Gambon to read at his funeral, held on 31 December 2008, during the cast's memorial remarks from the stage as well as at the funeral and also in Words and Music, transmitted on the BBC Radio 3 on 22 February 2009. In late 2009, Gambon had to withdraw from his role of W. H. Auden in The Habit of Art (being replaced by Richard Griffiths) because of ill health.

In April 2010, Gambon returned once again to the Gate Theatre Dublin to appear in Samuel Beckett's Krapp's Last Tape, which transferred to London's Duchess Theatre in October 2010. In 2009, he appeared in a television adaptation of Jane Austen's famously irrepressible Emma, a four-hour miniseries that premiered on BBC One in October 2009, co-starring Romola Garai. He played Mr Woodhouse, for which he received a 2010 Primetime Emmy Award for Outstanding Supporting Actor in a Miniseries or a Movie nomination for his performance. In 2010, Gambon took a supporting role in Tom Hooper's historical drama The King's Speech where he portrayed an ailing King George V. He acted alongside Colin Firth, Geoffrey Rush, Helena Bonham Carter and Guy Pearce. In 2011, the film received 12 Academy Awards nominations, more than any other film in that year. The film won four Oscars including Best Picture, Director, Actor and Adapted Screenplay. Gambon appeared in the 2010 Christmas Special of Doctor Who, "A Christmas Carol". During the 2010s, he was also known for his voice work. He appeared as the Narrator in the British version of Kröd Mändoon and the Flaming Sword of Fire. In 2013, Gambon provided the voice for The Prophet, a character in the MMORPG video game The Elder Scrolls Online.

=== 2012–2019: Television projects and final roles ===
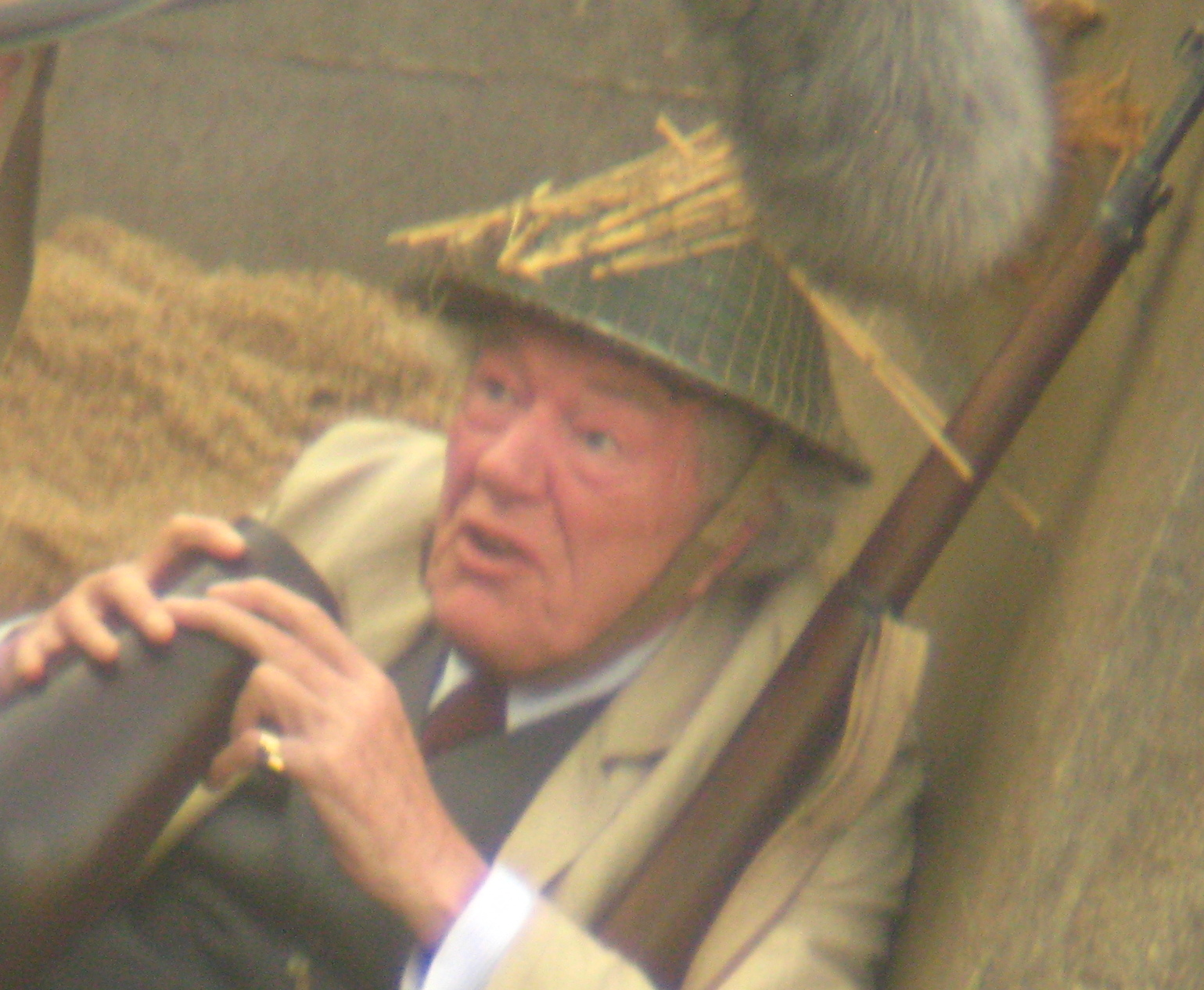
Gambon on the set of Dad's Army in October 2014

In 2012, he starred with Eileen Atkins in an adaptation of Beckett's radio play, All That Fall. The director, Trevor Nunn, staged the performance as a studio recording of a radio play so that the cast performed with script in hand. Its premiere was at the Jermyn Street Theatre and it later transferred to the Arts Theatre. In November 2013 the production transferred to 59E59 Theaters in New York. Also 2012, Gambon reunited with Dustin Hoffman in the HBO horse-racing drama Luck, which was cancelled in March 2012 after three horses died on set. Gambon participated in the live event, National Theatre Live: 50 Years On Stage (2013), a production that was a part of the celebration of the 50th anniversary of the National Theatre. The presentation included live performances, interspersed with documentary footage, and archival footage of live performances of original productions from the National Theatre. Gambon joined Derek Jacobi in a live performance from No Man's Land by Harold Pinter. In 2012, he played a role in Dustin Hoffman's directorial debut with Quartet, based on the same-titled play by Ronald Harwood and starring Maggie Smith, Tom Courtenay, Billy Connolly and Pauline Collins. The film premiered at the 2012 Toronto International Film Festival to favourable reviews. The review aggregator website Rotten Tomatoes reported an 80% approval rating with the consensus reading, "It's sweet, gentle, and predictable to a fault, but Dustin Hoffman's affectionate direction and the talented cast's amiable charm make Quartet too difficult to resist." The following year, he was cast in the role of Howard Mollison in the adaptation of the best-selling book The Casual Vacancy by J.K. Rowling. The BBC One miniseries, produced in association with HBO, consists of three one-hour parts. Production began 7 July 2014 in South West England.

In early 2015, Gambon announced that due to the increasing length of time it was taking him to memorise his lines, he was giving up stage work. He had previously tried using an earpiece and being given prompts by theatre staff, but found this unsatisfactory. In 2015 and 2018, Gambon starred as Henry Tyson in the first and third series of Sky Atlantic's Fortitude. In 2016, Gambon was the narrator for the Coen Brothers' Hollywood comedy Hail, Caesar!, which satirised the 1950s Hollywood film industry and featured an ensemble cast including Josh Brolin, George Clooney, Alden Ehrenreich, Ralph Fiennes, Jonah Hill, Scarlett Johansson, Frances McDormand, Tilda Swinton and Channing Tatum. The film was well received by critics, earning an approval rating of 86% on Rotten Tomatoes with the consensus being, "Packed with period detail and perfectly cast, Hail, Caesar! finds the Coen brothers delivering an agreeably lightweight love letter to post-war Hollywood." The film also received an Academy Award nomination for its Production Design. Gambon then appeared in comedy film Dad's Army playing the iconic Private Godfrey, based on Arnold Ridley, who had played the character in the original classic BBC series of the same name. Gambon also provided voice-overs as Uncle Pastuzo in the Paddington films (2014, 2017). In March 2018, it was announced that Gambon would star in the comedy series Breeders. However, in April 2019, it was reported that Gambon left the series as he was having trouble memorising lines due to his issues with memory loss. In 2019, he appeared in the biographical film Judy, about Judy Garland, starring Renée Zellweger, Rufus Sewell, Finn Wittrock and Jessie Buckley. That same year Gambon appeared in his final film role in Adrian Shergold's period thriller Cordelia, acting alongside Johnny Flynn and Catherine McCormack.

== Personal life ==
Gambon married mathematician Anne Miller in 1962. Known for being protective of his privacy, he once responded to an interviewer's question about his wife by asking, "What wife?" The couple had homes in Gravesend, Kent, and Aldeburgh, Suffolk. They had one son, Fergus (born 1964), who later became a ceramics expert on the BBC series Antiques Roadshow. During his association with the Royal National Theatre, Gambon had a long-term extramarital relationship with Lyn Haill, an administrator and the theatre's longtime Head of Publications. Largely kept out of the public eye at the time, the relationship was later documented in Jasper Rees's authorised biography, Michael Gambon: The Authorised Biography (2026).

Gambon brought Philippa Hart, a woman 25 years his junior, to the set while filming the 2001 film Gosford Park and introduced her to his co-stars as his girlfriend. When their affair was publicly revealed in 2002, he moved out of the home he shared with his wife, though they later reconciled. He was with Hart, a set designer, from 2000, when they worked together on Channel 4 series Longitude. In February 2007, it was revealed that Hart was pregnant with Gambon's child and gave birth to a son. The couple had a second son in 2009. They owned a home in west London.

In the New Year Honours 1998, Gambon was appointed a Knight Bachelor for services to drama. On 17 July 1998, he was invested by Prince Charles at Buckingham Palace.

Gambon was a qualified private pilot. His love of cars led to his appearance on the BBC series Top Gear. He drove the Suzuki Liana so aggressively that, approaching the final corner, he lost control and tipped the car dramatically onto two wheels, nearly rolling it. He still completed the lap in 1 minute 55 seconds, even managing to knock off a wing mirror. The final corner of the Top Gear test track was named "Gambon Corner" or simply "Gambon" in his honour. He appeared on the programme again in 2006 and set a time in the Chevrolet Lacetti of 1:50.3, a significant improvement on his previous time of 1:55. He clipped his namesake corner the second time, and when asked why by Jeremy Clarkson, replied, "I don't know, I just don't like it."

Gambon died in Witham on 27 September 2023, aged 82, following a bout of pneumonia. In 2024, it was reported that Hart, his long-term girlfriend and mother of two of his sons, had been left nothing in the actor's will: almost all of his fortune was passed to Lady Gambon, his wife of 61 years.

== Awards and nominations ==
Year	Award	Category	Nominated work	Result
1997	Tony Award	Best Actor in a Play	Skylight	Nominated
1979	Olivier Awards	Best Actor of the Year in a New Play	Betrayal	Nominated
1980	Olivier Awards	Best Actor in a Revival	The Life of Galileo	Nominated
1983	Olivier Awards	Best Actor in a New Play	Tales from Hollywood	Nominated
1985	Olivier Awards	Best Comedy Performance	A Chorus of Disapproval	Won
1987	Olivier Awards	Best Actor	A View from the Bridge	Won
1990	Olivier Awards	Best Comedy Performance	Man of the Moment	Won
1996	Olivier Awards	Best Actor	Skylight	Nominated
1998	Olivier Awards	Best Actor	Tom and Clem	Nominated
1999	Olivier Awards	Best Actor	The Unexpected Man	Nominated
2001	Olivier Awards	Best Actor	The Caretaker	Nominated
2003	Olivier Awards	Best Actor	A Number	Nominated
2005	Olivier Awards	Best Actor	Endgame	Nominated
2009	Olivier Awards	Best Actor	No Man's Land	Nominated
2002	Golden Globe Award	Best Actor in a Mini-Series or a TV Movie	Path to War	Nominated
2002	Primetime Emmy Award	Lead Actor in a Miniseries or a Movie	Path to War	Nominated
2010	Primetime Emmy Award	Outstanding Supporting Actor in a Limited Series or Movie	Emma	Nominated
2001	Screen Actors Guild Award	Cast in a Motion Picture	Gosford Park	Won
2010	Screen Actors Guild Award	Cast in a Motion Picture	The King's Speech	Won
1987	British Academy Television Awards	Best Actor	The Singing Detective	Won
2000	British Academy Television Awards	Best Actor	Wives and Daughters	Won
2001	British Academy Television Awards	Best Actor	Longitude	Won
2002	British Academy Television Awards	Best Actor	Perfect Strangers	Won
2012	British Independent Film Awards	The Richard Harris Award	Honorary	Won
