= Man of the Moment =

Man of the Moment may refer to:

- Man of the Moment (1935 film), starring Douglas Fairbanks, Jr. and Laura La Plante
- Man of the Moment (1955 film), featuring Norman Wisdom
- Man of the Moment (play), a 1990 play by Alan Ayckbourn
- Man of the Moment, a horse which won the 1970 Breeders' Futurity Stakes
