= Danny Lee Wynter =

British actor, playwright, and activist

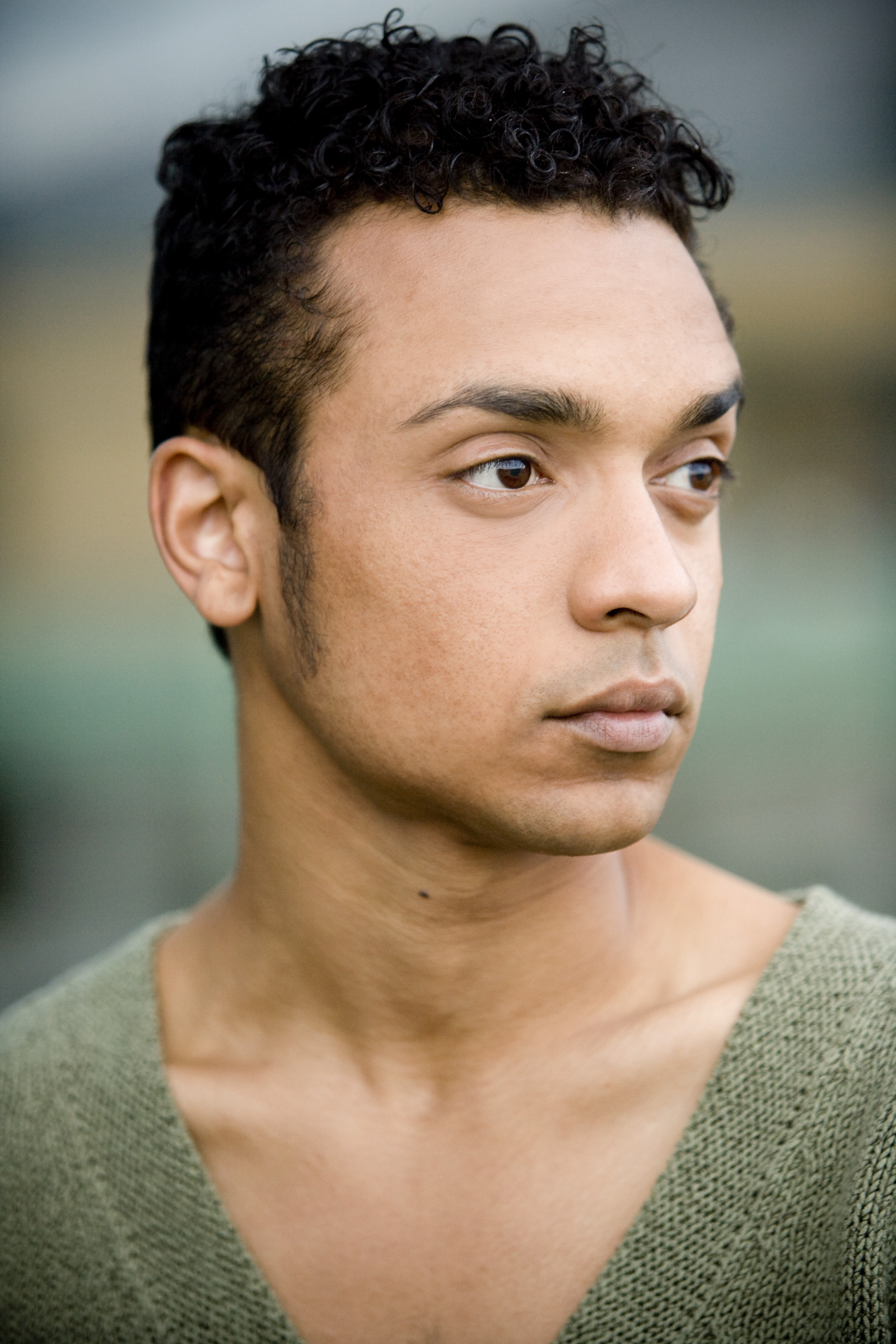
- Wynter in 2009 or earlier
- Born: Danny Lee Wynter; 25 May 1982 (age 44); Barking, London, England
- Occupation: Actor
- Years active: 2006–present

Danny Lee Wynter (born 25 May 1982) is a British actor, playwright, and activist.

He is best known for playing the lead in Stephen Poliakoff's BBC films Joe's Palace (2007) and Capturing Mary (2007), and also for appearing in Dominic Cooke's 2021 National Theatre revival of The Normal Heart, for which he was nominated for an Olivier Award for Best Supporting Actor. Mainly recognised for his stage work, he began his professional training while ushering at the Royal Court Theatre.

His writing has appeared in numerous publications including The Stage Newspaper, The Huffington Post, The Guardian and The Evening Standard.

His debut play, BLACK SUPERHERO, opened at the Royal Court Theatre in 2023. His follow up play, Ilford Boy, opened Off the West End at the Donmar Warehouse in October 2026.

== Personal life ==
Danny Lee Wynter was born in Barking, East London and grew up in a single parent family in Essex. His mother, a train attendant, is of Romany Gypsy and Italian ancestry, and his father, a local businessman, is of Jamaican descent. He has been open about his sexuality since the beginning of his career identifying as gay.

In 2000, he studied performing arts at Middlesex University, where he trained in clown under John Wright, founder of Trestle Theatre Company and As Told by an Idiot. In 2003, he gained a place at the London Academy of Music and Dramatic Art to train in classical acting.

== Career ==
While at the London Academy of Music and Dramatic Art, Wynter ushered at the Royal Court theatre, a job which he left to make his professional debut in Stephen Poliakoff's 2007 BBC/HBO films Joe's Palace and Capturing Mary.

After receiving acclaim for his performance in the Poliakoff films, Wynter was cast by Dominic Dromgoole as the Fool to David Calder's King Lear for Shakespeare's Globe. His other work for the company includes Henry IV Part I and II, opposite Roger Allam, and new plays The Frontline by Che Walker and Bedlam by Nell Leyshon. He also appeared as the titular character in Milton's Comus in the Wanamaker Playhouse.

Theatre work includes The Glass Menagerie for the Nuffield Theatre, Southampton, Deathwatch for The Print Room at The Coronet Theatre, Notting Hill, The Maids for HOME Theatre, Manchester, Forty Years On for Chichester Festival Theatre, Cell Mates for Hampstead Theatre, The Changing Room for the Royal Court, The Miser for The Royal Exchange Manchester, Much Ado About Nothing for The Old Vic Theatre Company (directed by Sir Mark Rylance), and the National Theatre's revival of The Normal Heart, for which he was nominated for an Olivier Award.

In January 2014, after responding to a trailer for a new season of TV drama which failed to include a single BAME artist, Wynter brought together a group of friends and colleagues, actresses Ruth Wilson and Stephanie Street, actor and director Daniel Evans, casting director Andy Pryor and actors Malcolm Sinclair and Kobna Holdbrook-Smith, to send out the message that the UK arts must reflect everyone regardless of race, gender, class, sexual orientation or disability. What started as a handful of voices soon became the Act for Change project. The organisations first public event was a sold out debate chaired by Baroness Shami Chakrabarti, then of the human rights group, Liberty. Held at London's Young Vic Theatre, the pilot debate was attended by various leading industry figures.

His debut play, BLACK SUPERHERO, opened on the main stage of the Royal Court Theatre in March 2023, with Wynter appearing as the lead character. The play, revolving around an out of work London actor in love with his married friend, the star of a Hollywood superhero franchise, was described by The Independent as a "funny and unflinching exploration of black masculinity", while The Stage observed it "never musters quite enough momentum or heft". A week after the play's opening night, Lee Wynter withdrew from his role as the play's lead with immediate effect, citing "personal reasons" as the cause for the "very difficult decision to withdraw from playing the role of David".

His second play, Ilford Boy, opened at the Donmar Warehouse in October 2026. In a five star review for The Times theatre critic Clive Davis cited it as "the most entertaining British play I've seen all year."

== Selected performances ==
- Hot Fuzz 2006 (Film) - Uncredited
- The Changing Room 2006 (Stage Play)
- Joe's Palace 2007 (Film) - Joe Dix
- Capturing Mary 2007 (Film) - Joe Dix
- The Fall of the House of Usher 2007 (Stage Play)
- King Lear 2008 (Stage Play) - The Fool
- The Frontline 2008 (Stage Play) - Benny
- A Doll's House 2008 (Stage Play)
- Holby City (2009) (TV Series) - 2 episodes
- The Miser 2009 (Stage Play) - Cléante
- Luther 2010 (TV series) - Tom Mayer, 1 episode
- Henry IV Part I 2010 (Stage Play) - Poins
- Henry IV Part II 2010 (Stage Play) - Poins
- Beat Girl 2012 (Film) - Derek
- St. John's Night 2012 (Stage Play)
- Mr Stink 2012 (TV Film) - Prime Minister's Aide, unnamed
- Partners in Crime 2015 (TV Series) - Gilbert Worthing, 2 episodes
- Censor 2021 (Film) - Perkins
