= 1990 Laurence Olivier Awards =

Edition of London theatre awards

1989/90 Laurence Olivier Awards

The 1990 Laurence Olivier Awards were held in 1990 in London celebrating excellence in West End theatre by the Society of London Theatre. As the previous ceremony was held in 1988, these awards honored productions from both 1989 and 1990, and have been listed as the 1989/90 Laurence Olivier Awards on the Society of London Theatre website since at least 2003.

== Winners and nominees ==
Details of winners (in bold) and nominees, in each award category, per the Society of London Theatre.

Play of the Year	Musical of the Year
**Racing Demon by David Hare – National Theatre Cottesloe**; Ghetto by Joshua Sobol – National Theatre Olivier; Man of the Moment by Alan Ayckbourn – Globe; Shadowlands by William Nicholson – Queen's	**Return to the Forbidden Planet – Cambridge**; Buddy – Victoria Palace; Miss Saigon – Theatre Royal Drury Lane; The Baker's Wife – Phoenix
Comedy of the Year
**Single Spies by Alan Bennett – National Theatre Lyttelton / Queen's**; Jeffrey Bernard Is Unwell by Keith Waterhouse – Apollo; Some Americans Abroad by Richard Nelson – RSC at the Pit; Steel Magnolias by Robert Harling – Lyric
Actor of the Year	Actress of the Year
**Oliver Ford Davies as The Rev. Lionel Espy in Racing Demon – National Theatre Cottesloe**; Nigel Hawthorne as C. S. Lewis in Shadowlands – Queens; Ian McKellen as Max in Bent – National Theatre Lyttelton and as Iago Othello – RSC at the Young Vic; Michael Pennington as Various in The Wars of the Roses – Old Vic	**Fiona Shaw as Celia in As You Like It – Old Vic, as Electra in Electra – RSC at the Barbican Pit and as Shen Te/Shui Ta in The Good Person of Sichuan – National Theatre Olivier**; Sheila Hancock as Prin in Prin – Lyric; Jane Lapotaire as Joy Davidman in Shadowlands – Queens; Prunella Scales as Elizabeth II in Single Spies – National Theatre Lyttelton
Outstanding Performance of the Year by an Actor in a Musical	Outstanding Performance of the Year by an Actress in a Musical
**Jonathan Pryce as The Engineer in Miss Saigon – Theatre Royal Drury Lane**; Alun Armstrong as Aimable Castagnet in The Baker's Wife – Phoenix; Matthew Devitt as Cookie in Return to the Forbidden Planet – Cambridge; Paul Hipp as Buddy Holly in Buddy – Victoria Palace	**Lea Salonga as Kim in Miss Saigon – Theatre Royal Drury Lane**; Patricia Hodge as Gertrude Lawrence in Noël and Gertie – Comedy; Judy Kuhn as Futura/Maria in Metropolis – Piccadilly; Elaine Paige as Reno Sweeney in Anything Goes – Prince Edward
Comedy Performance of the Year
**Michael Gambon as Douglas Beechey in Man of the Moment – Globe**; Alex Jennings as Dorante in The Liar – Old Vic; Alfred Molina as Charlie Fox in Speed-the-Plow – National Theatre Lyttelton; Peter O'Toole as Jeffrey Bernard in Jeffrey Bernard Is Unwell – Apollo
Outstanding Performance of the Year in a Supporting Role	Most Promising Newcomer of the Year in Theatre
**Michael Bryant as Polonius in Hamlet – National Theatre Olivier, as The Rev. Harry Henderson in Racing Demon and as Peacey in The Voysey Inheritance – National Theatre Cottesloe**; Linda Kerr Scott as Djigan in Ghetto – National Theatre Olivier; Simon Russell Beale in as Danny in Playing with Trains, as Lord Are in Restoration, as Henry McNeil in Some Americans Abroad and as Sir Fopling Flutter The Man of Mode – RSC at the Barbican Pit; Zoë Wanamaker as Emilia in Othello – RSC at the Young Vic	**Jeremy Northam as Edward Voysey in The Voysey Inheritance – National Theatre Cottesloe**; Glen Goei as Song Liling in M. Butterfly – Shaftesbury; Charlotte Keatley for writing My Mother Said I Never Should – Royal Court; Georgia Slowe as Juliet in Romeo and Juliet – RSC at the Barbican Pit
Director of the Year
**Michael Bogdanov for The Wars of the Roses – Old Vic**; Richard Eyre for Racing Demon and The Voysey Inheritance – National Theatre Cottesloe; Nicholas Hytner for Ghetto – National Theatre Olivier and Miss Saigon – Theatre Royal Drury Lane; Trevor Nunn for Othello – RSC at the Young Vic
Designer of the Year
**Bob Crowley for Ghetto, Hedda Gabler – National Theatre Olivier, Ma Rainey's Black Bottom – National Theatre Cottesloe and The Plantagenets – RSC at the Barbican**; The design team for Suicide for Love – National Theatre Lyttelton; Chris Dyer for The Merchant of Venice – Phoenix and The Wars of the Roses – Old Vic; John Napier for Miss Saigon – Theatre Royal Drury Lane and The Baker's Wife – Phoenix
Outstanding Achievement of the Year in Dance	Outstanding Achievement in Opera
**Kim Brandstrup for choreographing Orfeo, London Contemporary Dance Theatre – Sadler's Wells**; Nina Ananiashvili and Irek Mukhamedov for performing, Bolshoi Ballet – London Coliseum; David Bintley for choreographing Hobson's Choice, Sadler's Wells Royal Ballet – Royal Opera House; Siobhan Davies for choreographing Embarque, Rambert Dance Company – Sadler's Wells; Kenneth MacMillan for choreographing The Prince of the Pagodas, The Royal Ballet – Royal Opera House; Paul Taylor Dance Company for its season – Sadler's Wells	**Orpheus and Eurydice by Komische Oper – Royal Opera House**; Lear, English National Opera – London Coliseum; Survival Song, The Garden Venture – Donmar Warehouse; The Love for Three Oranges, English National Opera – London Coliseum; Un re in ascolto, The Royal Opera – Royal Opera House
Award for Outstanding Achievement
**Declan Donnellan for directing Fuenteovejuna – National Theatre Cottesloe**; Ute Lemper for conceiving and performing Kurt Weill Evening – Almeida; Philip Prowse for directing The Vortex – Garrick; John Wood in The Master Builder and The Tempest – RSC at the Barbican

== Productions with multiple nominations and awards ==
The following 15 productions received multiple nominations:

- 5: Miss Saigon
- 4: Ghetto and Racing Demon
- 3: Othello, Shadowlands, The Baker's Wife, The Voysey Inheritance and The Wars of the Roses
- 2: Buddy, Jeffrey Bernard Is Unwell, Man of the Moment, Return to the Forbidden Planet, Single Spies and Some Americans Abroad

The following three productions received multiple awards:

- 3: Racing Demon
- 2: Miss Saigon and The Voysey Inheritance

== See also ==
- 44th Tony Awards
