= 1999 Laurence Olivier Awards =

Edition of London theatre awards

The 1999 Laurence Olivier Awards were held in 1999 in London celebrating excellence in West End theatre by the Society of London Theatre.

== Winners and nominees ==
Details of winners (in bold) and nominees, in each award category, per the Society of London Theatre.

| Play of the Year | Best New Musical |
|---|---|
| **The Weir by Conor McPherson – Royal Court**; Copenhagen by Michael Frayn – National Theatre Cottesloe / Duchess; The Blue Room by David Hare – Donmar Warehouse; The Unexpected Man by Yasmina Reza – RSC at the Barbican Pit / Duchess | **Kat and the Kings – Vaudeville**; Rent – Shaftesbury; Saturday Night Fever – London Palladium; Whistle Down the Wind – Aldwych |
| Best New Comedy | Best Entertainment |
| **Cleo, Camping, Emmanuelle and Dick by Terry Johnson – National Theatre Lyttelton**; Alarms and Excursions by Michael Frayn – Gielgud; Love upon the Throne by Patrick Barlow, Martin Duncan and John Ramm – Comedy; Things We Do for Love by Alan Ayckbourn – Gielgud / Duchess | **Do You Come Here Often – Vaudeville**; Much ado about Everything – Playhouse; Steve Coogan Is the Man Who Thinks He's It – Lyceum; Shakespeare's Villains: A Masterclass in Evil – Haymarket |
Outstanding Musical Production
**Oklahoma – National Theatre Olivier / Lyceum**; Annie – Victoria Palace; Into the Woods – Donmar Warehouse; Show Boat – Prince Edward
| Best Actor | Best Actress |
| **Kevin Spacey as Theodore "Hickey" Hickman in The Iceman Cometh – Old Vic**; Michael Gambon as Parsky in The Unexpected Man – RSC at the Barbican Pit / Duchess; Iain Glen as Various in The Blue Room – Donmar Warehouse; Jim Norton as Jack in The Weir – Royal Court; David Suchet as Antonio Salieri in Amadeus – Old Vic | **Eileen Atkins as Woman in The Unexpected Man – RSC at the Barbican Pit / Duchess**; Sinéad Cusack as Mai O'Hara in Our Lady of Sligo – National Theatre Cottesloe; Judi Dench as Filumena Marturano in Filumena – Piccadilly; Nicole Kidman as Various in The Blue Room – Donmar Warehouse; Diana Rigg as Agrippina and Phaedra in Britannicus and Phèdre – Albery |
| Best Actor in a Musical | Best Actress in a Musical |
| **Jody Abrahams, Loukmaan Adams, Mandisa Bardill, Junaid Booysen, Salie Daniels and Alistair Izobel (The Cast) as Kat Diamond, Bingo, Lucy, Ballie, The Narrator and Magoo in Kat and the Kings – Vaudeville**; Adam Garcia as Tony Manero in Saturday Night Fever – London Palladium; Hugh Jackman as Curly McLain in Oklahoma – National Theatre Olivier / Lyceum; Clarke Peters as Billy Flynn in Chicago – Adelphi | **Sophie Thompson as The Baker's Wife in Into the Woods – Donmar Warehouse**; Krysten Cummings as Mimi Márquez in Rent – Shaftesbury; Maria Friedman as Roxie Hart in Chicago – Adelphi; Josefina Gabrielle as Laurey Williams in Oklahoma – National Theatre Olivier / Lyceum |
| Best Performance in a Supporting Role | Best Supporting Performance in a Musical |
| **Brendan Coyle as Brendan in The Weir – Royal Court**; Emma Fielding as Lady Teazle in The School for Scandal – RSC at the Barbican; Adam Godley as Kenneth Williams in Cleo, Camping, Emmanuelle and Dick – National Theatre Lyttelton; Michael Sheen as Wolfgang Amadeus Mozart in Amadeus – Old Vic | **Shuler Hensley as Jud Fry in Oklahoma – National Theatre Olivier / Lyceum**; Wilson Jermaine Heredia as Angel Dumott Schunard in Rent – Shaftesbury; Jimmy Johnston as Will Parker in Oklahoma – National Theatre Olivier / Lyceum; Andrew Kennedy as Rooster Hannigan in Annie – Victoria Palace |
| Best Director | Best Theatre Choreographer |
| **Howard Davies for The Iceman Cometh – Old Vic**; Sam Mendes for The Blue Room – Donmar Warehouse; Trevor Nunn for Oklahoma – National Theatre Olivier / Lyceum; Ian Rickson for The Weir – Royal Court | **Susan Stroman for Oklahoma – National Theatre Olivier / Lyceum**; Jody Abrahams and Loukmaan Adams for Kat and the Kings – Vaudeville; Peter Gennaro for Annie – Victoria Palace; Arlene Philips for Saturday Night Fever – London Palladium |
| Best Set Designer | Best Costume Designer |
| **Anthony Ward for Oklahoma – National Theatre Olivier / Lyceum**; Maria Björnson for Britannicus and Phèdre – Albery; William Dudley for Amadeus – Old Vic and Cleo, Camping, Emmanuelle and Dick – National Theatre Lyttelton; Richard Hoover for Not About Nightingales – National Theatre Cottesloe; Mark Thompson for The Blue Room – Donmar Warehouse and The Unexpected Man – RSC at the Barbican Pit / Duchess | **William Dudley for Amadeus – Old Vic and The London Cuckolds – National Theatre Lyttelton**; Maria Björnson for Britannicus and Phèdre – Albery; Bunny Christie for As You Like It – Globe; Robert Jones for Henry VIII – RSC at the Young Vic |
Best Lighting Designer
**Hugh Vanstone for The Blue Room – Donmar Warehouse and The Unexpected Man – RSC at the Barbican Pit / Duchess**; Paule Constable for Amadeus – Old Vic and Uncle Vanya – RSC at the Young Vic; Mark Henderson for Britannicus and Phèdre – Albery; David Hersey for Oklahoma – National Theatre Olivier / Lyceum
| Outstanding Achievement in Dance | Best New Dance Production |
| **William Forsythe for the season, Ballett Frankfurt – Sadler's Wells**; Trisha Brown for choreographing L'Orfeo – Barbican; Bill T. Jones for We Set Out Early...Visibility Was Poor – Sadler's Wells; Twyla Tharp for the season – Barbican | **Enemy in the Figure, Ballett Frankfurt – Sadler's Wells**; The Man with a Moustache, City of London Ballet – Sadler's Wells; Room of Cooks, The Royal Ballet – Sadler's Wells; We Set Out Early...Visibility Was Poor, Bill T. Jones/Arnie Zane Dance Company – Sadler's Wells |
| Outstanding Achievement in Opera | Outstanding New Opera Production |
| **The Royal Opera House Orchestra for Le nozze di Figaro, The Bartered Bride and The Golden Cockerel**; Sandra Ford in The Tales of Hoffmann and Mary Stuart – London Coliseum; René Jacobs for musical directing L'Orfeo – Barbican; Andrew Shore in Gianni Schicchi and The Elixir of Love – London Coliseum | **La clemenza di Tito, Welsh National Opera – Shaftesbury**; Boris Godunov, English National Opera – London Coliseum; L'Orfeo, Théâtre Royal de la Monnaie – Barbican; Il trittico, English National Opera – London Coliseum |
Society Special Award
**Peter Hall**

== Productions with multiple nominations and awards ==
The following 17 productions, including one ballet and one opera, received multiple nominations:

- 9: Oklahoma
- 6: The Blue Room
- 5: Amadeus and The Unexpected Man
- 4: Britannicus, Phèdre and The Weir
- 3: Annie, Cleo, Camping, Emmanuelle and Dick, Kat and the Kings, L'Orfeo, Rent and Saturday Night Fever
- 2: Chicago, Into the Woods, The Iceman Cometh and We Set Out Early...Visibility Was Poor

The following five productions received multiple awards:

- 4: Oklahoma!
- 2: Kat and the Kings, The Iceman Cometh, The Unexpected Man and The Weir

== See also ==
- 53rd Tony Awards
