= Cordelia (2019 film) =

- Directed by: Adrian Shergold
- Written by: Adrian Shergold; Antonia Campbell-Hughes
- Starring: Antonia Campbell-Hughes; Johnny Flynn
- Release dates: 2019 (Dinard Film Festival); October 23, 2020 (United Kingdom)
- Running time: 91 minutes
- Country: United Kingdom
- Language: English

Cordelia is a 2019 British horror thriller drama film written by Adrian Shergold and Antonia Campbell-Hughes, directed by Shergold and starring Campbell-Hughes and Johnny Flynn. Other cast includes Joel Fry, Catherine McCormack, Alun Armstrong, and Michael Gambon in his final film role before his death in September 2023.

== Cast ==
- Antonia Campbell-Hughes as Cordelia/Caroline (Russell)
- Johnny Flynn as Frank (Ryan)
- Michael Gambon as Moses
- Joel Fry as Matt
- Catherine McCormack as Kate
- Alun Armstrong as Roger

== Release ==
The film premiered at the Dinard Film Festival in France in 2019. The film was then released in theaters in the United Kingdom on October 23, 2020.

== Reception ==
The film has a 74% rating on Rotten Tomatoes based on 23 reviews. Glenn Kenny of RogerEbert.com awarded the film three stars. Peter Bradshaw of The Guardian awarded the film three stars out of five. Rob Rector of Film Threat rated the film an 8 out of 10. Ferdosa of Screen Rant awarded the film two and a half stars out of five.

Jeannette Catsoulis of The New York Times gave the film a positive review and wrote, "Enigmatic and imperfect, but nonetheless absorbing and consistently unsettling, Cordelia offers a haunting visualization of a breaking-apart psyche."
