= Capturing Mary =

- Genre: Drama
- Created by: Stephen Poliakoff
- Written by: Stephen Poliakoff
- Directed by: Stephen Poliakoff
- Starring: Maggie Smith; David Walliams; Ruth Wilson; Danny Lee Wynter
- Country of origin: United Kingdom
- Original language: English

Production
- Editor: Clare Douglas
- Running time: 105 minutes

Original release
- Network: BBC Two
- Release: 12 November 2007

Related
- Joe's Palace

Capturing Mary is a BBC television drama (co-produced by HBO), written and directed by Stephen Poliakoff, starring Dame Maggie Smith, David Walliams, Ruth Wilson and Danny Lee Wynter. It was aired on BBC Two on 12 November 2007. It is linked, by the central character of Joe, to another Poliakoff drama, Joe's Palace, which was first aired on 4 November 2007.

== Overview ==
The drama saw a repeat of Danny Lee Wynter's caretaker character of Joe, who encounters former socialite Mary (played by Maggie Smith in the present and Ruth Wilson in her youth) when she visits the house featured in Joe's Palace. We see flashbacks to her past links with the house. This present-day meeting between Joe and Mary overlaps with the events of Joe's Palace.

== Plot ==
We first meet the character of Mary as an old woman (Maggie Smith) in the present. The "old" Mary, a former journalist and socialite, arrives at the house of Elliot Graham's late father. Joe (Danny Lee Wynter), the caretaker of the house, takes pity on her and invites her in. She begins to recount to Joe the significance of the house to her.

Moving from room to room, she tells Joe of the 1950s high society soirees she was invited to in the house. She recalls how Mr Graham's soirees were attended by the great and the good – the aristocracy, the nouveaux riche, industrialists, newspaper barons, editors, actors and directors. She tells Joe that she has been haunted by the memory of a sinister man named Greville White (David Walliams) whom she met one evening in the house. Greville White turns out to be a social climber whose influence reached into high society. Mary recalls that he was supremely charming but utterly evil. We see Greville and the "young" Mary (Ruth Wilson) in Mr Graham's cellar selecting fine wines for a salad that he has prepared. In the cellar, Greville tells Mary of dark secrets involving members of the British Establishment who are enjoying Mr Graham's soiree in the rooms above them. The secrets involve child abuse, sexual perversion, anti-semitism and racism amongst the great and the good.

He feigns friendship with Mary but she rejects him because of his malevolence. Greville retaliates by using his influence over the newspaper proprietors to deny her work in Britain. The audience encounters subsequent meetings between the two in the 1950s and 1960s at Mr Graham's soirees and other social events. We see the sinister destruction of Mary's life as she becomes preoccupied by Greville's influence on her and her slide into despair and alcoholism. The end of the drama sees Greville re-appear in Kensington Gardens in the present. Mary is now an old woman but the sinister Greville has not aged since they first met in the 1950s.

== Cast ==
- Maggie Smith as Mary Gilbert
- David Walliams as Greville White
- Ruth Wilson as Young Mary Gilbert
- Danny Lee Wynter as Joe
- Gemma Arterton as Liza
- Michael Byers as Zach

== Production ==
=== Casting ===
The programme also starred David Walliams as the character Greville White. Gemma Arterton, still in drama school at the time, played her first professional acting role as Greville White's young date, Liza.
