= A Chorus of Disapproval (play) =

1984 play by Alan Ayckbourn

- Original window card, 1984
- Written by: Alan Ayckbourn
- Original language: English
- Subject: An amateur operatic society mirrors The Beggar's Opera
- Genre: Comedy

Premiere
- Date premiered: 2 May 1984
- Place premiered: Stephen Joseph Theatre (Westwood site); Scarborough, England
- Official website

A Chorus of Disapproval is a 1984 play written by English playwright Alan Ayckbourn.

== Synopsis ==
The story follows a young widower, Guy Jones, as he joins an amateur operatic society that is putting on The Beggar's Opera. He rapidly progresses through the ranks to become the male lead, while simultaneously conducting liaisons with several of the female cast. Many of the songs from The Beggar's Opera are kept within the play, usually being sung with their own, new context.

== First productions ==
Ayckbourn wrote the work for the 1984 summer season at his Stephen Joseph Theatre, Scarborough, where it opened on 2 May. Peter Hall, director of the National Theatre, London, had expressed an interest in the piece and Ayckbourn modified his initial concept to suit an eventual large-scale production; on 1 August 1985 it opened in the National's Olivier auditorium, with Ayckbourn directing, Michael Gambon playing amateur director Dafydd Llewellyn and Bob Peck as newcomer Guy Jones. The female leads were Gemma Craven, Imelda Staunton and Kelly Hunter.
