= Perfect Strangers (2001 serial) =

2001 British TV drama

- Genre: Drama
- Written by: Stephen Poliakoff
- Directed by: Stephen Poliakoff
- Starring: Michael Gambon; Lindsay Duncan; Matthew Macfadyen; Claire Skinner; Toby Stephens
- Country of origin: United Kingdom
- Original language: English
- No. of series: 1
- No. of episodes: 3

Production
- Production company: TalkBack Productions for BBC

Original release
- Network: BBC Two
- Release: 10 May – 24 May 2001

Perfect Strangers (Note: It aired on BBC America under the title Almost Strangers.) is a three-part television drama that ran from 10 to 24 May 2001, produced for BBC Two. It was written and directed by Stephen Poliakoff, and starred Michael Gambon, who won a British Academy Television Award for his performance, Lindsay Duncan, Matthew Macfadyen, Claire Skinner, and Toby Stephens. Anton Lesser and Timothy Spall also appear. The drama received two Royal Television Society Awards and a Peabody Award. It was also nominated for the BAFTA TV Award for Best Drama Serial.

The action takes place at and between two large family reunions, one at a London hotel (with significant parts filmed in Claridge's.) and the other at a rural conference centre once owned by the family. Poliakoff's use of old photographs to unlock the intricacies of individuals' lives is prolific.

In 2025, the BBC broadcast a 15 minute programme Stephen Poliakoff Remembers... Perfect Strangers, in which he discussed making the series.

== Summary ==
The series begins at a family reunion of considerably more than a hundred guests, drawing together the extended branches of the Symon family. Raymond Symon (Michael Gambon) reluctantly attends with his wife Esther (Jill Baker) and son Daniel (Matthew Macfadyen). Raymond's father Lionel (Jay Simon) became estranged from the rest of the family, as did Raymond, meaning that Daniel is unaware of the sprawl of his extended family. Raymond suffers a minor stroke just after giving a withering speech to those attending the reunion. His subsequent bedridden state forces him to appreciate the character of relatives that reflect his.

The stories Daniel learns about his family's past are episodic and non-linear, from his mysterious presence in a photograph taken at a children's party that he can't remember attending, to the wartime experiences of three distant elderly cousins. An important plot strand concentrates on a rift between the cousins Rebecca (Claire Skinner) and Charles (Toby Stephens) and their aunt Alice (Lindsay Duncan), who had been a pseudo-mother to them and their brother Richard (JJ Feild). The trio distanced themselves from Richard when his mental illness worsened and - after his sudden accidental death - Rebecca blamed Alice and Alice blamed herself, leading them to grow apart.

Daniel attempts to reconcile the trio, whilst also falling in love with Rebecca. His efforts culminate at another family reunion, this time in the garden of a former rural residence of the family - they are unsuccessful, though it seems that Alice's heartfelt tribute to Richard in her dinner toast at the reunion might yet lead Rebecca to forgive her. At this second reunion Raymond also discovers an affair between Lionel and another family member, much of which occurred in an office with a painting resembling Daniel's party photograph. He realises that in old age Lionel had invited Daniel to a party at his erstwhile lover's house and dressed him to resemble the painting as a sign that Lionel still loved her.

== Cast ==
- Michael Gambon ... Raymond
- Lindsay Duncan ... Alice
- Matthew Macfadyen ... Daniel
- Claire Skinner ... Rebecca
- Toby Stephens ... Charles
- Jill Baker ... Esther
- Timothy Spall ... Irving
- Anton Lesser ... Stephen
- Michael Culkin ... Sidney
- Kelly Hunter ... Poppy
- Kathleen Byron ... Edith
- Muriel Pavlow ... Violet
- Sheila Burrell ... Grace
- Peter Howell ... Ernest
- Tony Maudsley ... Peter
- Camilla Power ... Martina
- Marianne Borgo ... Nazik

== Awards ==
| Award | Year | Type | Person(s) | Category |
|---|---|---|---|---|
| BAFTA TV Award | 2002 | Nominee | Lindsay Duncan | Best Actress |
| BAFTA TV Award | 2002 | Winner | Michael Gambon | Best Actor |
| BAFTA TV Award | 2002 | Nominee | John Chapman; Stephen Poliakoff | Best Drama Serial |
| BAFTA TV Award | 2002 | Nominee | Paul Tothill | Best Editing (Fiction/Entertainment) |
| BAFTA TV Award | 2002 | Nominee | Adrian Johnston | Best Original Television Music |
| BAFTA TV Award | 2002 | Nominee | Cinders Forshaw | Best Photography & Lighting (Fiction/Entertainment) |
| International Emmy | 2002 | Nominee | — | TV Series |
| Peabody Awards | 2003 | Winner | — | — |
| Royal Television Society | 2002 | Winner | — | Best Serial and TV Drama |
| Royal Television Society | 2002 | Winner | Stephen Poliakoff | Best Writer |
| Royal Television Society | 2002 | Nominee | Anushia Nieradzik | Best Costume Design |
| Royal Television Society | 2002 | Nominee | Dorka Nieradzik | Best Make Up Design |
| Royal Television Society | 2002 | Nominee | Paul Tothill | Best Editing |
