= The Challengers (TV series) =

Canadian television series

- Genre: Biography
- Presented by: Alexander Ross; Merle Shain
- Country of origin: Canada
- Original language: English
- No. of seasons: 1

Production
- Producer: Gabor Apor
- Running time: 30 minutes
- Production company: Projections Productions

Original release
- Network: CBC Television
- Release: 26 January 1979 – 2 April 1980

The Challengers is a Canadian biographical television series that aired on CBC Television from 1979 to 1980.

== Premise ==
This series profiled various successful Canadians. Its debut on 26 January 1979 featured a winning squash player, a rodeo performer and a hockey skate blade inventor.

== Scheduling ==
The half-hour series was broadcast Fridays at 10:00 p.m. (Eastern) from 26 January to 30 March 1979. Additional special hour-long episodes were broadcast in 1980, on 11 January, 8 February and 2 April.
