= Path to War =

2002 film by John Frankenheimer

- DVD cover
- Genre: Biographical
- Written by: Daniel Giat
- Directed by: John Frankenheimer
- Starring: Michael Gambon; Donald Sutherland; Alec Baldwin; Bruce McGill; James Frain; Felicity Huffman; Frederic Forrest; John Aylward; Philip Baker Hall; Tom Skerritt; Diana Scarwid; Sarah Paulson; Gerry Becker; Peter Jacobson
- Music by: Gary Chang
- Country of origin: United States
- Original language: English

Production
- Executive producers: Cary Brokaw; John Frankenheimer; Edgar J. Scherick; Howard Dratch
- Producers: Guy Riedel; Shirley Davis
- Cinematography: Stephen Goldblatt; Nancy Schreiber
- Editor: Richard Francis-Bruce
- Running time: 165 minutes
- Production companies: Avenue Pictures; Edgar J. Scherick Associates; HBO Films

Original release
- Network: HBO
- Release: May 18, 2002

Path to War is a 2002 American biographical television film, produced by HBO and directed by John Frankenheimer. It was the final film directed by Frankenheimer, who died seven weeks after the film debuted on HBO. It was also the last film produced by Edgar J. Scherick that was released during his lifetime—he died seven months after its initial airing on HBO.

The film deals directly with the Vietnam War as seen through the eyes of United States President Lyndon B. Johnson and his cabinet members.

== Plot ==
In January 1965, President Johnson (Michael Gambon) takes office, pledging to focus on his "Great Society" promises regarding civil rights, poverty, and education. He is pressured by General Earle Wheeler (Frederic Forrest) to send combat troops into South Vietnam. There is general consensus in the cabinet except for George Ball (Bruce McGill) who argues the North Vietnamese will continue to escalate attacks on US advisors there. Johnson orders US combat forces to South Vietnam believing it will stabilize the situation.

To pursue his Great Society goals, Johnson meets with George Wallace (Gary Sinise) regarding African American voter registration, and unsuccessfully requests Martin Luther King Jr. (Curtis McClarin) curtail civil rights protests until the situation in Vietnam is resolved.

General Wheeler continues to call for additional troops and further escalation of the war. Clark Clifford (Donald Sutherland), a former advisor to President Kennedy, supports Ball and argues for every 100,000 men the North Vietnamese send into South Vietnam, the US will need to send in 1,000,000 to achieve the 10 to 1 ratio needed in a guerilla war. Secretary of Defense Robert McNamara (Alec Baldwin) is confident a smaller military force will bring the North Vietnamese to negotiate a peace.

After each escalation, General Wheeler and General William Westmoreland (Tom Skerritt) state that final victory can only be achieved with additional troops. A plan by Westmoreland outlines massive increases in troops and the bombing of North Vietnam. Clifford argues against escalation and suggests Johnson's election by majority means withdrawing cannot hurt him politically. McNamara argues a US withdrawal would damage the country's prestige and relationship with allies, and remains confident that troop increases and bombing will lead to a negotiated peace. Johnson approves both.

McNamara is shaken when Norman Morrison immolates himself in a public demonstration against the war, and realize the North Vietnamese don't prefer a negotiated peace as he first thought. McNamara tells Johnson that he can no longer hide the spiraling cost of the war in the budget. A CIA representative (J.K. Simmons) briefs the cabinet on the negligible impact of the bombing campaign, stressing the North Vietnamese people continue to have high morale. General Weaver insists on expanding their targets to include Hanoi and Haiphong, with greater risk to civilians. Johnson is surprised by McNamara's indecisiveness and Clifford reminds Johnson he effectively made the decision six months earlier.

As the expanded bombing program goes ahead, opposition to the war grows in the US. Johnson is particularly upset by criticism of the war from Robert F. Kennedy, who he fears will run against him for president in 1968 and worries the war will overshadow the work he accomplished with the Great Society. When the North Vietnamese disperse their industry to protect it from the expanded bombing campaign, General Wheeler asks to expand the scope to include targets in population centers. Johnson again approves.

McNamara becomes increasingly despondent at the poor results of the bombing. In January 1968 the North launches the Tet Offensive against most South Vietnamese cities and the American embassy in Saigon. American and allied combat power crushes the attacking forces, giving the generals a major operational victory but the scope of the attacks reveals the American military's predictions of the war being nearly over were untrue. McNamara testifies before Congress that he now opposes the bombing expansion. Johnson shuffles McNamara from Secretary of Defense to head the World Bank, leaving him to learn about it from the newspapers. Clark Clifford, the new Secretary of Defense, tells Johnson if he doesn't stop the war he won't be reelected in 1968. Johnson rages at the holdovers in cabinet from the Kennedy era and Clifford reminds him Johnson was responsible for the final decisions.

Johnson gives a televised speech announcing he'll restrict the bombing and seek negotiation, and with his focus on ending the war, will not run for President in 1968. The end credits reveal the war continued under President Nixon and ultimately cost 58,000 American and 2,000,000 Vietnamese lives.

== Cast ==
The film stars Michael Gambon as President Johnson, Alec Baldwin as Secretary of Defense Robert McNamara and Donald Sutherland as presidential advisor Clark M. Clifford, who succeeds McNamara as Secretary of Defense. Gary Sinise reprised his role as George Wallace from Frankenheimer's 1997 biopic of Wallace.

Actor	Role
Michael Gambon	Lyndon B. Johnson
Donald Sutherland	Clark M. Clifford
Alec Baldwin	Robert McNamara
Bruce McGill	George Ball
James Frain	Richard N. Goodwin
Felicity Huffman	Lady Bird Johnson
Frederic Forrest	Earle Wheeler
John Aylward	Dean Rusk
Philip Baker Hall	Everett Dirksen
Gary Sinise	George C. Wallace
Tom Skerritt	William Westmoreland
Cliff De Young	McGeorge Bundy
Chris Eigeman	Bill Moyers
John Valenti	Jack Valenti
Gerry Becker	Walt Rostow
Sarah Paulson	Luci Baines Johnson
Francis Guinan	Nicholas Katzenbach
Curtis L. McClarin	Martin Luther King Jr.
Randy Oglesby	John Stennis
Patricia Kalember	Margaret Craig McNamara
Diana Scarwid	Marny Clifford
Madison Mason	John McCone
Gina-Raye Carter	Lynda Bird Johnson
Robert Cicchini	Joseph Califano
Scott Atkinson	Officer

== Reception ==
=== Critical response ===
Television critic Matt Zoller Seitz in his 2016 book co-written with Alan Sepinwall titled TV (The Book) named Path to War as the 6th greatest American TV-movie of all time, writing: "This nearly three-hour epic plays like the greatest political drama that Oliver Stone never made.... This is easily the greatest of Frankenheimer's late-period TV work, which equals his finest work from the 1960s". According to The Washington Post: "Gambon is entirely up to the task of making a larger-than-life icon seem painfully -- and in the end, helplessly -- human. It is a performance of fire and brimstone".

=== Accolades ===
Sutherland won a 2002 Golden Globe Award for Best Supporting Actor – Series, Miniseries or Television Film for his performance as Clifford.

== See also ==
- 2002 in television
- Presidency of Lyndon B. Johnson
