= The Unexpected Man =

Play written by Yasmina Reza

- Original language: French
- Written by: Yasmina Reza
- Genre: Comedy
- Setting: A train ride from Paris to Frankfurt

Premiere
- Date: 8 April 1998
- Place: Royal Shakespeare Company, London

The Unexpected Man (French: L'homme du hasard) is a play written in 1995 by Yasmina Reza. The play is set in a train from Paris to Frankfurt, with two people sharing a compartment. One is a famous author, and the other is a woman who admires his work.

The Unexpected Man had its UK premiere in April 1998 with the Royal Shakespeare Company at the Barbican Centre in London. The production, directed by Matthew Warchus, and starring Eileen Atkins and Michael Gambon, subsequently transferred to the Duchess Theatre on the West End. This production later moved Off-Broadway to the McGinn/Cazale Theater in October 2000, and was nominated for the Drama Desk Award for Outstanding Play, as well as the Lucille Lortel Award for Outstanding Play.

== Plot ==
A man and a woman sit opposite each other in the detached intimacy of a train compartment on a journey from Paris to Frankfurt. He is a world-famous author, she carries his latest novel in her bag and ponders the dilemma of reading it in front of him. As both the woman and man ponder their situation in the compartment, they bring past events and philosophies up in separate monologues. Finally in the ending of the play, they speak conversationally, and in the last line of the show the woman calls the author by his name, revealing to him that she did indeed know who he was.

== Characters ==
Parsky: A well-known author, travelling to Frankfurt to meet his daughter's significantly older fiancé.

Martha: A middle-aged woman, a fan of Parsky's oeuvre.

== Productions ==
=== Duchess Theatre, West End ===
The Unexpected Man had its UK premiere with the Royal Shakespeare Company at the Barbican Centre in London from 8 April – 9 May 1998. The production was translated to English by Christopher Hampton, directed by Matthew Warchus, and starred Eileen Atkins as Martha and Michael Gambon as Paul. The play subsequently transferred to the West End's Duchess Theatre from 10 June – 22 August 1998, with the same creative team.

=== McGinn/Cazale Theater, Off-Broadway ===
The Unexpected Man had its U.S. premiere Off-Broadway at the McGinn/Cazale Theater from 24 October 2000 – 28 January 2001, with 112 performances. This production was once again directed by Warchus, with Atkins reprising her role (here known as The Woman) alongside Alan Bates (here referred to as The Man). It received several accolades, including nominations from the Lucille Lortel Awards for Best Play, Best Actress, and Best Actor; Bates won the latter. He was also nominated for a Drama Desk Award, while Atkins was also nominated for an Outer Critics Circle Award. (Note: See IOBDB link for full list of awards.)

=== The Geffen Playhouse, Los Angeles ===
The Unexpected Man had its regional premiere at the Geffen Playhouse in Los Angeles, CA from 18 September - 27 October 2001. Directed by Maria Mileaf, this production featured Holland Taylor as Martha and Christopher Lloyd as Paul. The production received critical acclaim, with Variety stating

"The follow-up to her hit Art, Yasmina Reza's "The Unexpected Man" received an underwhelming response in New York, which makes it a bit unexpected that the production is so enjoyable. Christopher Lloyd and Holland Taylor dig into this difficult piece with clarity, finding its intelligence, its humor and, ultimately, its pleasing warmth. Director Maria Mileaf — who also staged the touring version of “Art” — deserves a lot of credit here, too, making sure that what suspense there is builds to a genuine climax."

=== Other productions ===
Cesear's Forum, Cleveland's minimalist theatre company, presented the play at Kennedy's Down Under, Playhouse Square in a May/June 2007 production.
