= Joe's Palace =

- Genre: Drama
- Created by: Stephen Poliakoff
- Written by: Stephen Poliakoff
- Directed by: Stephen Poliakoff
- Starring: Danny Lee Wynter; Sir Michael Gambon; Rupert Penry-Jones; Kelly Reilly; Rebecca Hall
- Narrated by: Danny Lee Wynter
- Country of origin: United Kingdom
- Original language: English

Production
- Editor: Clare Douglas
- Production companies: HBO Films; BBC Films; Talkback Thames

Original release
- Network: BBC One
- Release: 4 November 2007

Related
- Capturing Mary

Joe's Palace is a BBC television drama film, (co-produced by the BBC and HBO) and written and directed by Stephen Poliakoff. It was first aired on BBC One on 4 November 2007. It is linked, by the central character of Joe, to the Poliakoff drama Capturing Mary which was aired (on BBC Two) on 12 November 2007.

== Plot ==
The play revolves around the character of Joe (who is also the narrator), a teenager who has just left school and finds himself employed by Elliot Graham, an agoraphobic billionaire.

Joe's task is to act as doorman/caretaker for one of Graham's houses, a palatial property in central London. Graham himself refuses to live in the house and instead resides in a more modest property over the road. Nevertheless, Graham employs a whole team of servants (including Joe's mother—how he got the job) to keep the place spotless even though it has no apparent use. Joe is at first hired to work during the afternoons only but, following the departure of the first caretaker (played by Clive Russell), Joe takes over the whole day and is also allowed to sleep there at night if he so wishes.

It becomes apparent very early on that the house is associated with bad memories. None of the staff remains for very long—Joe's mother disappears off to Spain with her new lover, the first caretaker smashes most of the plates before very nearly throwing himself off the roof, and even a homeless person whom Joe invites back for company senses the bad vibes about the place. Joe, it seems, is much more grounded so none of this appears to affect him.

Graham appears obsessed with finding out some dark secret concerning his father's wealth (Graham inherited the wealth) and has hired many accountants and historians to research this. He states that he would like to spend his money to do good, but he has to know where it came from first. He even sends Joe onto the Antiques Roadshow with a collection of gold snuffboxes worth nearly a million pounds to see if he can glean any more about their origin from the specialist Geoffrey Munn. This dark secret appears to be tied up in the bad vibes concerning the house. Meanwhile, Joe, on Graham's permission, allows the house to be used by Richard, a self-centered cabinet minister and friend of Graham's as a place for assignations with his mistress Charlotte. Joe develops a Platonic attraction toward Charlotte, and is perturbed when Richard eventually turns up with a new mistress—though he continues to see Charlotte on occasion as a friend.

Eventually, on Joe's suggestion, Graham hires Tina, a woman who works at the local delicatessen (which both Joe and Graham frequent) to go through his paperwork, and she does eventually find the dark secret. However, just as Tina is about to reveal this to Graham and Joe at the house, Graham loses his nerve, saying he does not want to put off hearing the secret but does not want to hear it first in that house. Later, Joe joins Graham on a trip to the country castle (represented by Bodiam Castle) which Graham's father had given him, and there Graham tells Joe what Tina has told him—the first foundations of Graham's father's fortune were in his doing business with German companies and Nazi officials in the 1930s. These dealings were not treasonous, but this nevertheless made Graham's father complicit in some of the earlier actions of the Holocaust, particularly in his non-condemnatory attitude to the abuse of Jews in a Berlin park during that time and his acceptance of the antiques as gifts from his German business partners (who had stolen them from Jews). Having told Joe, Graham attempts suicide, but Joe prevents him.

The drama ends with Joe himself moving on, and Graham now using his money for good, and having traced the rightful owners of the antiques.

== Cast ==
- Danny Lee Wynter as Joe, the central character - a doorman and caretaker.
- Sir Michael Gambon as Elliot Graham, Joe's employer - a billionaire financier.
- Rupert Penry-Jones as Richard - a cabinet minister.
- Kelly Reilly as Charlotte - Richard's mistress.
- Rebecca Hall as Tina - an employee of the local delicatessen.

== Related media ==
In the linked drama Capturing Mary, the present-day meeting between Joe and the titular Mary (played by Dame Maggie Smith in the present and Ruth Wilson in her youth) presumably happens within the same time-frame as the events in Joe's Palace as Joe is still in his position as doorman/caretaker in the house.
