= Man of the Moment (play) =

- Programme from world première
- Original language: English
- Written by: Alan Ayckbourn
- Characters: Vic; Douglas; Trudy; Jill; Kenny; Sharon; Ruy; Marta
- Subject: Celebrity criminals
- Genre: Comedy Drama
- Setting: Vic's Mediterranean villa

Premiere
- Date: 10 August 1988
- Place: Stephen Joseph Theatre (Westwood site), Scarborough
- Official website

Man of the Moment is a play by the British playwright Alan Ayckbourn. It was premiered at the Stephen Joseph Theatre in Scarborough on 10 August 1988 and transferred to the Globe Theatre in the West End on 14 February 1990.

== Original West End cast ==
- Jill Rillington, TV presenter - Samantha Bond
- Douglas Beechey, former hero who prevented a bank robbery by Parks and whose future wife was shot in the face by Parks during the robbery - Michael Gambon
- Vic Parks, professional bank-robber and TV personality - Peter Bowles
- Trudy Parks, Vic's second wife - Diane Bull
- Kenny Collins, Parks's manager -David Cunningham
- David - Paul Stewart
- Sharon, Parks's children's nanny - Shirley-Anne Selby
- Ruy, Parks's gardener - Daniel Collings
- Ashley Barnes - Terence Booth
- Marta - Doreen Andrew

== Radio adaptation ==
As part of celebrations for Ayckbourn's 70th birthday, a radio adaptation directed by Martin Jarvis was broadcast on BBC Radio 4 at 2.30pm on 11 April 2009, with the following cast:

- Jill Rillington - Lisa Dillon
- Trudy Parks - Janie Dee
- Douglas Beechey - Alex Jennings
- Vic Parks - Tim Pigott-Smith
- Kenny Collins - Damian O'Hare
- Sharon - Ella Smith
- Ruy - Alan Shearman
- Floor manager – Michael Simkins
- David - John Baddeley
- Film crew - Kenneth Danziger, Matthew Wolf
- Children - Matilda Wickham and Alfie Wickham
