= Polak =

Polak is the Polish noun for a Pole (also in several other Slavic languages). It is also a surname. In 2020 there were over 21,500 persons with the surname in Poland.

== Notable people with the surname include ==
- A. Polak Daniels (1842–1891), Dutch chess master
- Abraham Polak (1910–1970), Israeli historian, professor at the Tel Aviv University
- Ada Polak (1914–2010), Norwegian art historian
- Anna Dresden-Polak (1906–1943), née Polak, Jewish Dutch gymnast
- Anna Sophia Polak (1874–1943), Jewish feminist and author
- Ben Polak (born 1961), British professor of economics
- Benedykt Polak (c. 1200 – c. 1280), Polish Franciscan friar, traveler, explorer and interpreter
- Bojan Polak (1918–2004), Yugoslav military officer, politician, and athlete
- Boris Polak (born 1954), Israeli world champion and Olympic sport shooter
- Carel Polak (1909–1981), Dutch politician
- Cezary Polak, (born 2003), Polish footballer
- Christian Polak (born 1950), French businessman and author
- Clairy Polak (1956–2023), Dutch journalist
- Clark Polak (1937–1980), American businessman, publisher, journalist, and LGBT activist
- Eleni-Klaoudia Polak (born 1996), Greek athlete specialising in the pole vault
- Elza Polak (1910–1995), Yugoslav horticulturist
- Elżbieta Polak (born 1959), Polish politician
- Eric Polak, American fantasy artist
- David Polak, American business executive and philanthropist from Beverly Hills, California
- Fred Polak (1907–1985), Dutch sociologist and politician
- Gottlieb Polak (1883–1942), Chief Rider and Riding Master of the horses Spanish Riding School
- Graham Polak (born 1984), Australian Football League player
- Hanna Polak (born 1967), Polish director, cinematographer and producer
- Henri Polak (1868–1943), Dutch trade unionist and politician
- Henry Polak (1882–1959), British humanist
- Jacques J. Polak (1914–2010), Dutch economist
- Jakob Eduard Polak (1818–1891), Austrian physician active in Iran
- Jakub Polak (musician) (1545–1605), Polish musician
- Jakub Polák (anarchist) (1952–2012), Czech anarchist and Roma rights activist
- Jason Polak (born 1968), Australian soccer player
- Johan Bernard Abraham Fortunatus Mayor Polak, Indonesian politician and sociologist
- Jo-Anne Polak (born 1959), first woman executive in the Canadian Football League
- Julia Polak (1939–2014), Argentine-born British pathologist
- Kyle Polak (born 1984), American goalkeeper
- Maralyn Lois Polak, American writer
- Marcin Polak (born 1982), Polish Paralympic cyclist
- Marek Polak (born 1963), Polish politician
- Maria Anna Polak, Polish and Canadian civil engineer
- Mary Polak (born 1967/68), Canadian politician
- Maximilien Polak (1930–2022), Dutch-born Canadian judge and politician
- Minus Polak (1928–2014), Dutch lawyer, politician, judge
- Mira Adanja Polak (born 1942), Serbian journalist, author and TV host
- Miroslav Polak (born 1958), Serbian football manager and player
- Monique Polak (born 1960), Canadian writer
- Nate Polak (born 1989), American soccer player
- Paul Polak (1933–2019), Czech-born American businessman
- Patrycja Polak (born 1991), Polish volleyball player
- Piotr Polak (born 1980), Polish actor
- Radek Polak (1870–1957), Dutch photographer
- Radek Polák (born 2010), Czech ice hockey player
- Radek Polak (born 2010), Czech pig
- Rie Polak-Mair (born 1896), Dutch war resister
- Sacha Polak (born 1982), Dutch film director
- Sjaak Polak (born 1976), Dutch footballer
- Stuart Polak, Baron Polak (born 1961), British politician and member of the House of Lords
- Tadeusz Polak (born 1944), Polish footballer
- Tyler Polak (born 1992), American soccer player
- Vojtěch Polák (born 1985), Czech ice hockey player
- Wim Polak (1924–1999), Dutch politician
- Wojciech Polak (born 1964), Roman Catholic archbishop of Gniezno, Poland
- Vasek Polak (1914–1997), Czech race car driver and racing team owner
- Željko Polak (born 1976), Bosnian-Herzegovinian footballer

== See also ==
- Polack (surname)
- Polack, a derogatory term
- Polák
- Polášek
- Poliakoff
- Pollack, a surname
- Pollak, a surname
- Polyakov
