= Polack (surname) =

Polack is a surname. One of its meanings may be Polish man. Variants: Polak, Pollack. Notable people sit the surname include:

- Abraham Isaac Polack, Dutch Jewish engraver
- Abraham Solomon Polack (1797–1873), English-born Australian auctioneer and convicted fraudster
- Elizabeth Polack (fl. mid-19th century), English playwright
- Indiyah Polack (born 1998), English media personality
- Israel Polack (1909–1993), Austro-Hungarian-born Romanian, Chilean, and Israeli textile industrialist
- Jan Polack (1435–1519), Polish painter
- Joel Samuel Polack (1807–1882), first Jewish settler in New Zealand
- Maria Polack (1787–1849), English novelist
