= 1550 in music =

1550 in music involved some significant events.

== Events ==
- Feb.26 – Robin Mallapert succeeded François Roussel as maestro di cappella at the Cappella Giulia at St Peter's Basilica in Rome.
- Oct.1 – Jacob Clemens employed as a singer and composer by the Marian Brotherhood in 's-Hertogenbosch, Netherlands. He leaves after just three months but does leave a parting gift of the seven-voice motet Ter eeren anser liever vrouwen.
- Giovanni Animuccia comes to Rome and is employed by Cardinal Guido Ascanio Sforza.

== Publications ==
- Antonino Barges – First book of villottas for four voices (Venice: Antonio Gardano), also includes a few works by Andrea Patricio
- Jacques Buus – First book of French chansons for five voices (Venice: Girolamo Scotto)
- Perissone Cambio – Second book of madrigals for five voices (Venice: Antonio Gardano)
- Baldassare Donato
  - Le napollitane, et alcuni madrigali for four voices (Venice: Girolamo Scotto)
  - First book of Canzon Villanesche alla Napolitana for four voices (Venice: Antonio Gardano), also includes a few pieces by Perissone Cambio
- Heinrich Faber – Ad musicam practicam introductio, published in Nuremberg.
- Claude Gervaise, ed.
  - Fourth book of dances for four instruments (Paris: Pierre Attaignant)
  - Fifth book of dances for four instruments (Paris: Pierre Attaignant)
- Hoste da Reggio – Magnificat for four voices (Milan: Innocentio Ciconiarus), also includes other hymns and motets
- Heinrich Isaac and Ludwig Senfl – the first two volumes of Choralis Constantinus, a collection of motets, was published in Nuremberg.
- John Marbeck – Booke of Common Praier noted, published in London.
- Francesco Portinaro – First book of madrigals for five voices (Venice: Antonio Gardano)
- Ramamatya – theoretical treatise on Carnatic music Svaramelakalanidhi.
- Cipriano de Rore – madrigal collection Il primo libro de madregali published in Ferrara.
- Adrian Willaert – Salmi spezzati, a collection of antiphonal sacred music, published in Venice.

== Births ==
- July 3 – Jacobus Gallus, late Renaissance Czech composer of Slovene origin (d. 1591)
- December 6 (baptised) – Orazio Vecchi, Italian composer (d. 1605)
- December 28 (baptised) – Vicente Espinel, Spanish writer, guitarist, poet and priest (d. 1624)
- probable – John Mundy, English composer and organist, son of composer William Mundy (d. 1630).
- probable – Sebastian Raval, Spanish composer (d. 1604)
- probable – Ippolito Baccusi, Italian composer (d. 1609)
- probable – Emilio de' Cavalieri, Italian composer, organist, choreographer, teacher and diplomat (d. 1602)
- probable – Francis Cutting, English lutenist and composer (d. 1596)
- probable – Konrad Hagius, German court composer, musician and Kapellmeister (d. 1616)
- probable – Simon Lohet, Flemish composer and organist (d. 1611)
- probable – Juan Navarro (of Cadiz), Spanish composer (d. c. 1610)
- probable – Alessandro Orologio, Italian composer and trumpeter (d. 1633)
- probable – Laura Peverara, Italian singer, harpist and dancer (d. 1601)
- probable – Jakub Polak, Polish lutenist and composer (d. c. 1605)
- probable – Jan Tollius, Dutch composer and choirmaster (d. c. 1603)

== Deaths ==
- Matthias Greitter poet, cantor, composer and singer died in Strasbourg (b. c. 1495; presumably plague)
- – approx. year Silvestro Ganassi dal Fontego, musician and writer, died in Venice (b. 1492)
- – approx. year Johannes Galliculus, theorist and writer, died in Leipzig (b. c. 1490)
- – approx. year Pierre Moulu, Franco-Flemish composer (b. c. 1484)
- – approx. year Jean Richafort, Netherlandish composer (b. c. 1480)
