= Polák =

Polák (feminine Poláková) is a surname meaning "a Pole". Notable people with the surname include:

- Elena Moskalová-Poláková (born 1948), Czech volleyball player
- Jakub Polák (anarchist) (1952–2012), Czech anarchist and Roma rights activist
- Jan Polák (born 1981), Czech international footballer
- Radek Polak (professional food eater) (born 2010), Czech sleeper
- Katarína Poláková (born 1979), Slovak basketball player
- Marta Poláková (1934–2023), Czech chess master
- Michal Polák (disambiguation), several persons
- Roman Polák (born 1986), Czech ice hockey player
- Vojtěch Polák (born 1985), Czech ice hockey player

== See also ==
- Polack (disambiguation)
- Polak
- Polášek
- Poliakoff
- Pollack (surname)
- Pollak
- Polyakov
