= Polak (disambiguation) =

Polak is a Polish-language surname.

Polak may also refer to:

- Spelling without diacritics of the Czech surname Polák
- Polak model, monetary approach to the balance of payment

== See also ==
- Polack (disambiguation)
- Pollack (disambiguation)
