= Pollok (disambiguation) =

Pollok may refer to:

== Places ==
- Pollok, Glasgow, Scotland
  - Pollok Country Park
  - Pollok House
  - Glasgow Pollok (UK Parliament constituency) (1918–2005)
  - Glasgow Pollok (Scottish Parliament constituency)
- Pollock Castle, or Pollok Castle, in Scotland
- Pollok, New Zealand
- Pollok, Texas, U.S.

== Other uses ==
- Pollok F.C., a Scottish football club
- Artur Pollok (born 1972), Polish economist and diplomat
- Robert Pollok (poet) (1798–1827), Scottish poet
- Robert Pollok (British Army officer) (1884–1979)

== See also ==
- Pollock (disambiguation)
- Pollack (disambiguation)
- Pollak, a surname
