= Polakova =

Polakova may refer to:

- Feminine form of a spelling Polakov of the Russian surname Polyakov
- Poláková, feminine form of the Czech surname Polák
- Poļakova, feminine form of the Latvian surname Poļakovs
