= Jakub Polak =

Jakub or Jakob Polak may refer to:

- Jakub Polak (musician) (c. 1545–c. 1605), Polish musician
- Jakob Eduard Polak (1818–1891), Austrian physician active in Iran
- Jakub Polák (anarchist) (1952–2012), Czech anarchist and Roma rights activist
