= Polyakov =

Polyakov or Poliakov (Russian: Поляков, Ukrainian: Поляков, Hebrew: פוליאקוב, romanized: Poliakov, Belarusian: Палякоў, romanized: Paliakoŭ), or Polyakova or Paliakova (feminine; Полякова), is a Slavic surname. Latvianized variant: Poļakovs. It may be transliterated as Poliakoff. Notable people with the surname include:

- Aleksei Poliakov (born 1974), Russian/Uzbek goalkeeper
- Alexander Polyakov (disambiguation), multiple individuals
- Alla Polyakova (born 1970), Russian politician
- Anatoly Polyakov (born 1980), Russian swimmer
- Andrei Polyakov (1950–2021), Russian diplomat
- Dmitri Polyakov (1921–1988), Soviet General and a spy for the CIA
- Boris Poliakov, Russian scientist and mechanical engineer
- Dzyanis Palyakow (born 1991), Belarusian footballer
- Elena Polyakova (born 1981), Russian ultramarathon runner
- Ella Polyakova (born 1941), Russian human rights activist
- Georgi Polyakov, Bulgarian sports shooter
- Germaine Poliakov, Ottoman-born French music teacher and Holocaust survivor
- Grigory Polyakov (1876–1939), Russian ornithologist
- Igor Polyakov (1912–2008), Soviet rower
- Ivan Alexeyevich Polyakov (1886–1969), Russian Cossack military leader
- Ivan Jaŭcejavič Paliakoŭ (1914–2004), Belarusan politician
- Lazar Polyakov (1843–1914), Russian entrepreneur
- Léon Poliakov (1910–1997), French historian
- Maria Palyakova (born 1974), Ukrainian volleyball player
- Maria Polyakova (born 1997), Russian diver
- Mikhail Polyakov (artist) (1903-1978), Russian graphic artist from Academia, a Soviet publishing house
- Mikhail Kharitonovich Polyakov (1884-1938), Soviet statesman, Chairman of the Executive Committee of Crimea
- Mikhail Nikolayevich Polyakov (1895-?), Ukrainian Bolshevik, member of the Ukrainian Supreme Soviet
- Mikhail Polyakov, Russian doctor, protagonist in the 2008 Russian film Morphine
- Moshe Poliakov, Israeli footballer and manager
- Mykola Polyakov (1946–2020), Ukrainian scientist
- Oleg Polyakov (born 1990), Russian footballer
- Samuel Polyakov (1837–1888), Russian businessman
- Sergei Polyakov (born 1968), Russian sport shooter
- Serhii Polyakov (born 1953), Ukrainian politician
- Sergey Polyakov (born 1951), Russian-American scientist
- Shlomo Poliakov, Jewish footballer
- Valeri Polyakov (1942–2022), Russian cosmonaut
- Veronika Polyakova (born 1999), Russian rhythmic gymnast
- Viktor Polyakov (born 1981), Ukrainian boxer
- Vladimir Polyakov (pole vaulter) (born 1960), Soviet/Russian pole vaulter
- Vladimir Polyakov (rower)
- Vladislav Polyakov (born 1983), Kazakhstani swimmer
- Yevgeni Viktorovich Polyakov (born 1980), Russian footballer
- Yevgeniya Polyakova (born 1983), Russian sprinter
- Yisrael Poliakov (1941–2007), Israeli comedian and actor
- Yael Poliakov (born 1977), Israeli actress, comedian, and screenwriter
- Yuriy Polyakov (born 1980), Russian-American scientist
- Polyakov family (Russian: Поляковы, Hebrew: משפחת פוליאקוב)
  - Samuel Polyakov (1837–1888), Russian businessman
  - Lazar Polyakov (1843–1914), Russian-Jewish entrepreneur
  - Yakov Polyakov (1832–1909), Russian financier, entrepreneur, and merchant

== See also ==
- Samanta Tīna Poļakova (born 1989) , Latvian singer
