= Abraham Polack =

Abraham Polack may refer to:

- Abraham Isaac Polack, Dutch Jewish engraver
- Abraham Solomon Polack (1797–1873), English-born Australian auctioneer and convicted fraudster

== See also ==
- Abraham Polak (1910–1970), Israeli historian
