= Pollock House =

Pollock House may refer to:

- Pollock House, Oxford, England
- Pollok House, Glasgow, Scotland
- Pollock-Krasner House and Study Center, Springs, New York

== See also ==
- Pollock (disambiguation)
