= William Deloitte =

English ship captain, trader, and land owner (1796–1870)

- Born: 1796; Kingston upon Hull, Yorkshire, England
- Died: 1870 (aged 73–74); Birchgrove, Colony of New South Wales
- Relatives: William Welch Deloitte (nephew)

William Salmon Deloitte (1796–1870) was an English ship captain, trader, and land owner.

== Biography ==
Deloitte was born in 1796 in Kingston upon Hull. His father, Jean Baptiste Deloitte, was a wealthy citizen of Arras in northern France, believed to have fled at the outbreak of the French Revolution. Jean Baptiste Deloitte had three sons including William. The eldest of the sons was John Onuphre Deloitte, the father of William Welch Deloitte, founder of British accounting firm, Deloitte.

In 1826, Deloitte was the captain of the ship Faith on its first voyage to Sydney. This was the first of many voyages between Australia, New Zealand, South America, Asia, and Britain. He was also the captain of the former convict ship Florentia, bringing some of the earliest settlers to the Colony of Australia as passengers.

In November 1826, Deloitte was acting for a Sydney firm alongside William Stewart in Horeke, trading with Muriwai, as well as other sellers.

In 1838, Deloitte established a mercantile business, leasing buildings on George Street in Sydney, which were formerly owned by auctioneer Abraham Solomon Polack. In that same year, he married Elizabeth Marlay, daughter of Major Marlay. They had 12 children together, including William Henry Deloitte, a public accountant and advocate for sugar growing in the Clarence and Richmond regions.

In 1840, he purchased 2000 acres in the Hokianga region and in 1841, he purchased James Bettington's former home and wharf at Miller's Point, which is now part of Barangaroo Headland. After retiring from his mercantile business, he became an adviser on port management for the Government of New South Wales.

He died in 1870 at Birchgrove, where he had retired to a villa overlooking the harbour.
