= Timashev =

Timashev (Russian: Тимашев) is a Russian masculine surname originating from the given name Timofey, its feminine counterpart is Timasheva. Notable people with the surname include:

- Alexander Timashev (1818–1893), Russian statesman
- Sergey Timashev (born 1937), Russian scientist
- Ratmir Timashev (born 1966), Russian IT entrepreneur
