= Polaco (slur) =

Insult towards Catalans

Flags of Spain, Poland and Catalonia

Polaco (lit. 'Pole') is a derogatory term used in Spain to refer to a Catalan person. Its etymological origins are uncertain, and all existing theories are speculative, usually based on the fact that the same word also refers non-derogatorily to Polish people. The term is primarily used in Madrid and the regions bordering Catalonia. Although rarely found in literature, it is common in colloquial speech, particularly during sporting events. Within Catalonia, the term has been reclaimed in some contexts, used without its derogatory connotations to differentiate Catalans from other Spaniards. The term is generally unknown in Poland.

== Antecedents ==
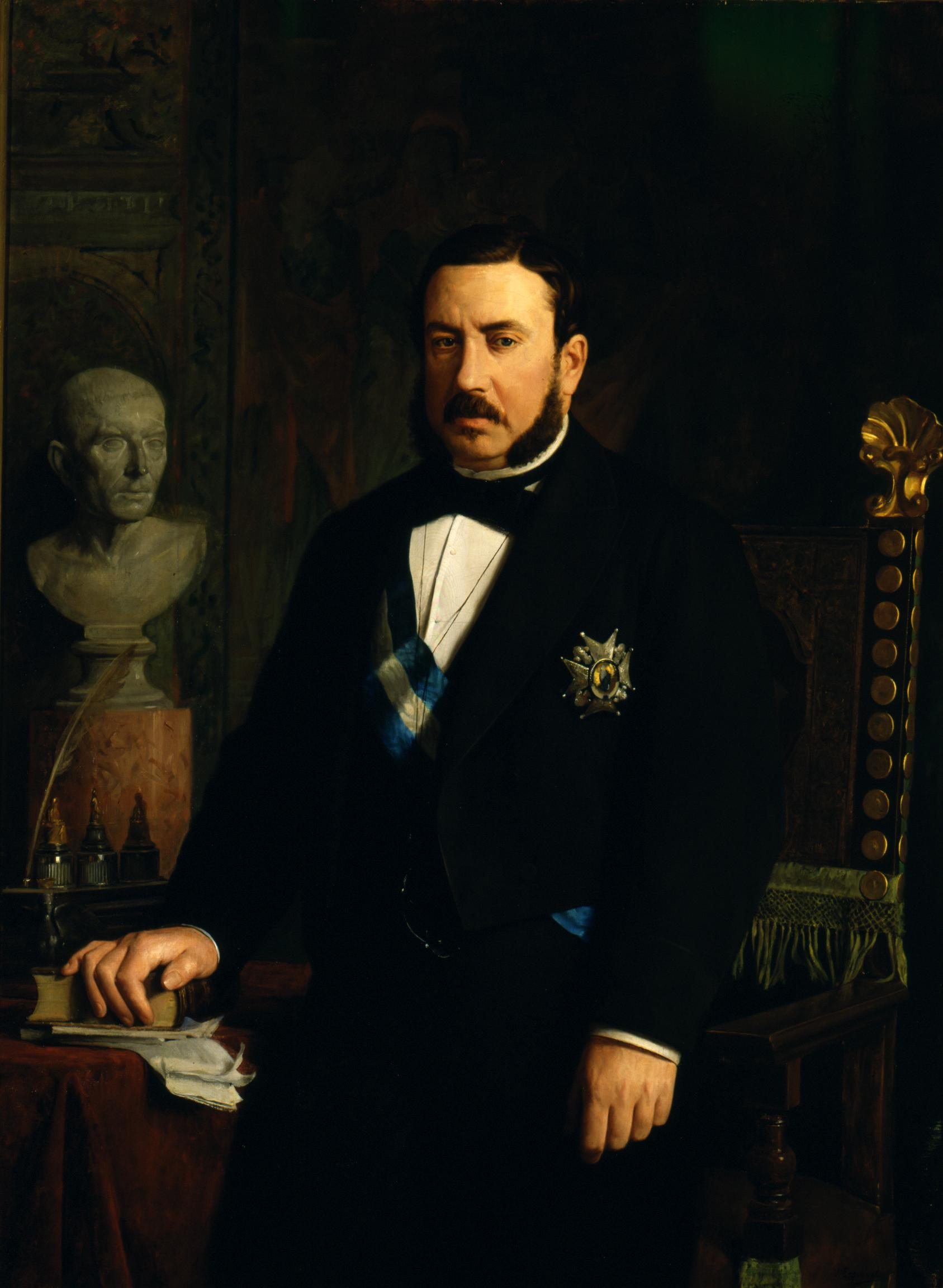
Sartorius

Historically the term polacos has been twice used in Spanish as an abuse or smear. In the late 18th century, the name was applied to followers of one of two Madrid drama schools; in theatrical auditoria they used to trade insults with a competitive group, named chorizos. The name allegedly stemmed from a cleric known as Padre Polaco, who used to lead his band. Both groupings were revived almost a century later with Luis Mariano de Larra's popular zarzuela Chorizos y polacos (1876); the title immortalized both names, though there is no indication that they were used beyond the theatrical realm or had anything to do with Catalonia. Once more the term polacos emerged against an entirely different background in the mid-1850s; the name was applied to a faction of Partido Moderado. The grouping was led by Luis José Sartorius, a politician erroneously supposed to be of Polish origin. Because of the way the group operated, the terms polacada, polaquería and polaquísmo soon began to denote favoritism, cronyism and arbitrary personal decisions; the term polaco denoted a member of a clientelist political network. The name disappeared from public usage following Sartorius' death, yet it enjoyed temporary revival in the 1880s and made it from the press to literature appearing in Benito Pérez Galdós 1888 novel Miau. The term polacada has barely survived to the present day in Spanish and is defined in dictionaries as "an act of favoritism"; when denoting a crony, the word polaco disappeared entirely.

One more episode of Poland-related naming practice occurred during the lifetime of the First Spanish Republic. Few liberal politicians dubbed Spain "Poland of the South"; the term was by no means derogatory and it was supposed to suggest that like Poland in the late 18th century, Spain faced the threat of a foreign reactionary intervention. The name was not in any way related to Catalonia. It was adopted only among a small circle of liberal intellectuals and used in the 1870s. The term did not survive as a commonly used reference.

== Origins ==
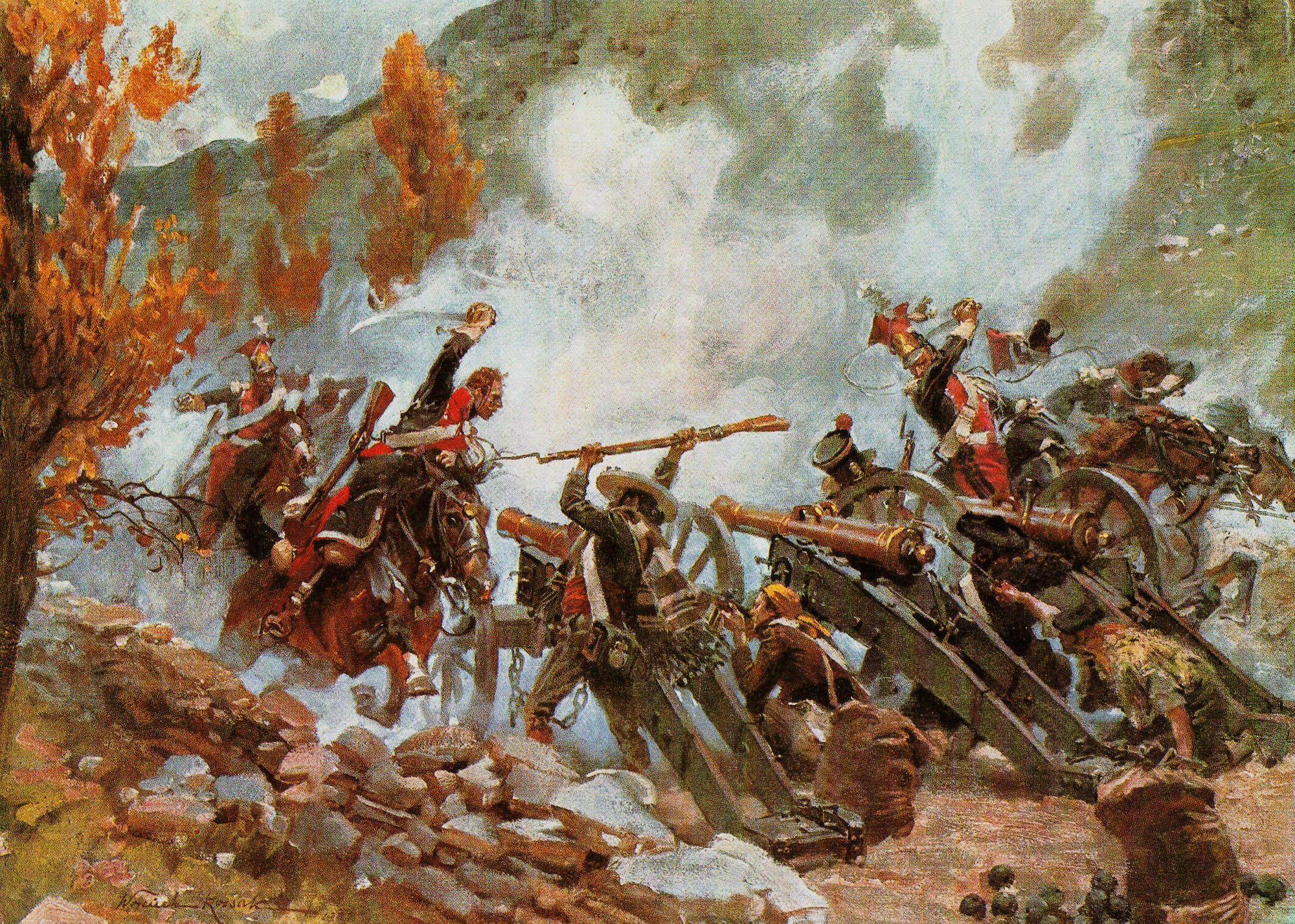
Poles during Peninsular War

Origins of the anti-Catalan usage of polacos are obscure. The numerous theories striving to clarify the issue are purely speculative and can hardly be verified. The most far-reaching hypothesis claims that supposed 17th-century merchant relations between Catalonia and Poland proved fertile soil for growth of ethnic stereotypes. Another theory points to the 18th-century theatrical debate, though it provides no clue as to the Catalan link. One more speculation regards Polish soldiers in Spain being confused with their Catalan allies; specifically some point to the War of Succession, some to the Peninsular War and some to the French intervention of 1823. Another theory points to Sartorius' supposed Catalan cronies. Some authors dwell upon perceived parallelism between the Polish independence movement of the late 19th century and the emergent Catalan or Basque nationalisms. Divided between France and Spain, Catalonia – the theory goes – resembled Poland, the country divided between Germany, Austria and Russia. Another version is that Catalan deputies to the Cortes were dubbed "Poles" because of their national exaltation. Few suggest that the derogatory term was exported to Spain by the Prussians. Others point to the Civil War period, when allegedly Nationalist soldiers on the Aragon front confused the Polish International Brigades volunteers with the Catalan Republican belligerents. One more group of students claim that the victorious Nationalists pledged to wipe out Catalonia from the maps just like the Germans did in case of Poland in 1939. A fairly popular thesis, partially supported by evidence, is that the insult emerged during Francoism as part of the barrack argot; the reference to Poland was casual and the term was to stigmatize Catalan recruits as "alien". There is a group of theories which do not refer to any point in time but bank on presumed similarities between the Catalans and the Poles, be it linguistic (perceived "slurping" sound of the language), religious (black Madonnas of Częstochowa and Montserrat) or other (both nations are supposedly stingy).

== Usage ==
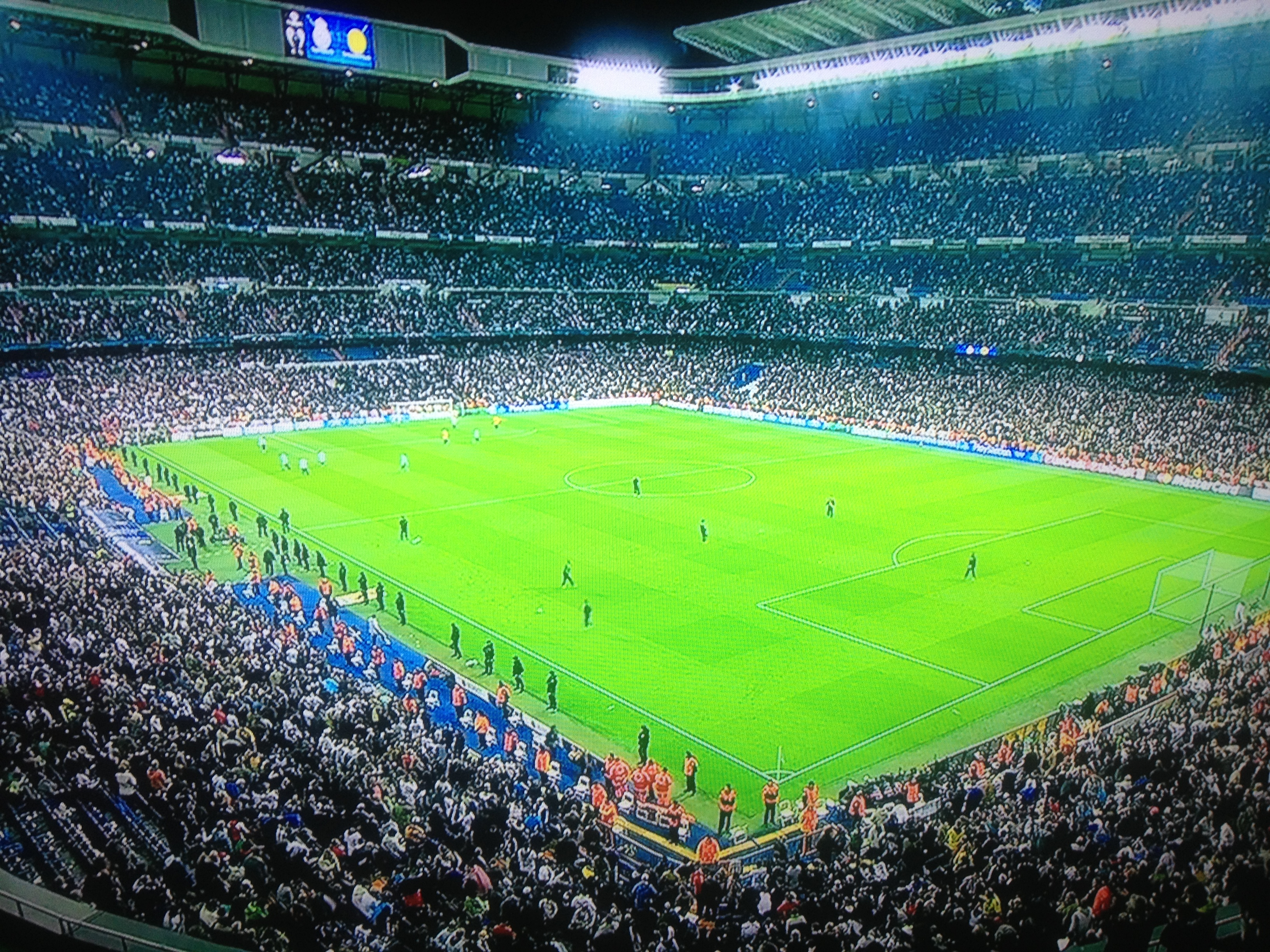
Real Madrid home game

While some derogatory terms for Catalans exist in modern Spanish, such as catalufos, catalinos and catalardos, none of them match the prevalence of polacos. Considered by some a classic form of anti-Catalan sentiment, the term is undeniably derogatory, though its intent can range from mildly patronizing to ironic or overtly hostile.

The origin of the term is obscure. Any original meaning has been lost, with the word now firmly entrenched as a slur. While insults like catalufos or catalardos are frequently used in politically charged contexts against perceived Catalan separatists, polacos has broader usage.

Geographically, the term can be heard throughout Spain, including regions far from Catalonia, such as Andalusia, though it remains especially common in Madrid. It is also frequently used in regions neighboring Catalonia, such as the Balearic Islands, Valencia, and Aragon. In Aragon, it is frequently directed towards residents of La Franja, the Catalan-speaking border region.

Polacos is primarily used in spoken Spanish, although it occasionally appears in writing, particularly on social media. Though characteristic of informal speech, it is sometimes found in literature. The term is generally used in the plural form and is often directed at a Catalan audience, either directly or indirectly, such as during confrontations.

Currently, its most recognized use is in chants at sporting events, particularly by fans of teams opposing FC Barcelona. The chant "es polaco el que no bote" ('he who doesn't jump is a polaco') has become a ritual at Real Madrid home games. Instances of public figures using the term, such as playwright Antonio Gala Velasco and sports manager Ramón Mendoza Fontela, typically attract media attention.

== Reception in Catalonia ==
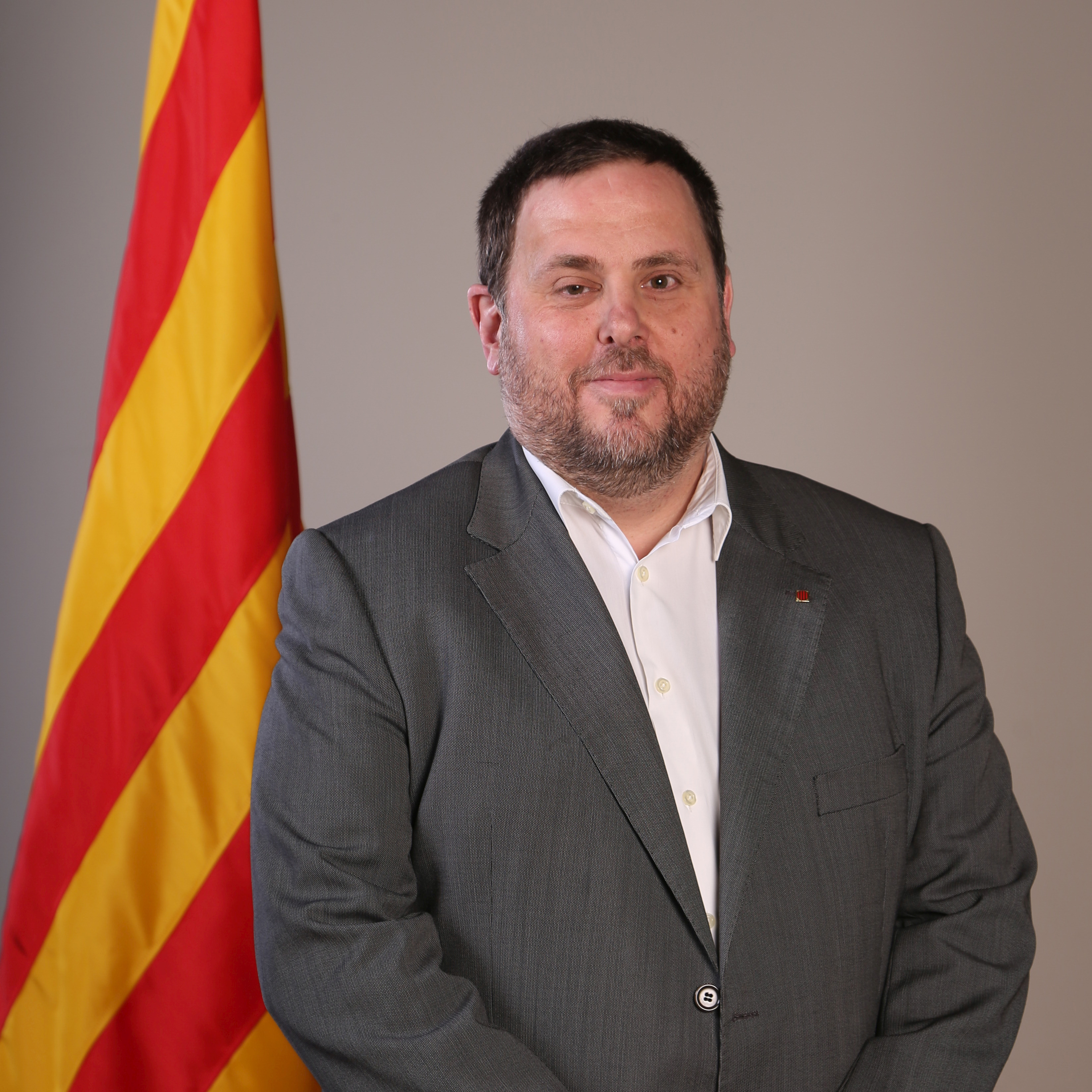
Oriol Junqueras

Among Catalans there is a general degree of awareness of the abusive role of the term polacos in Spanish. Their own response might fall into one of chiefly four categories. Indignation, due to its verbal and off-the-cuff nature, is the most difficult to document. Another, fairly popular response is to ignore or eliminate the abusive intention; instead, the term is assigned a neutral, favorable or even proud connotation. A TV survey on the streets of Barcelona seems to demonstrate that the city dwellers are scarcely troubled by the word, and some of them speculate about Catalan and Polish comparisons related to such values as patriotism, national pride or solidarity. Some nationalist Catalan politicians, like Oriol Junqueras Vies, underline what they believe to be attractive features rendering the two nations alike.

One more type of response, made popular by TV, is turning the term into a paradigm of general political ridicule. This is how the term polacos is positioned by the satirical show Polònia, aired since 2006 by regional public Catalan channel TV3. Often referring to Polish caricatures, the broadcast provides mocking commentary on ongoing political events in Spain and has proved to be a commercial success. In 2008 a sports-related and similarly formatted spin-off was launched, named Crackovia (a pun on the Polish city Kraków and "crack", or sports ace).

The word polacos has also filtered into the Catalan language, though it has lost its double designation. Occasionally when self-defining against the background of Catalan–Spanish skirmishes, Catalans will use the word polacs, while another word, polonesos refers to Poles.

== Reception among Poles ==
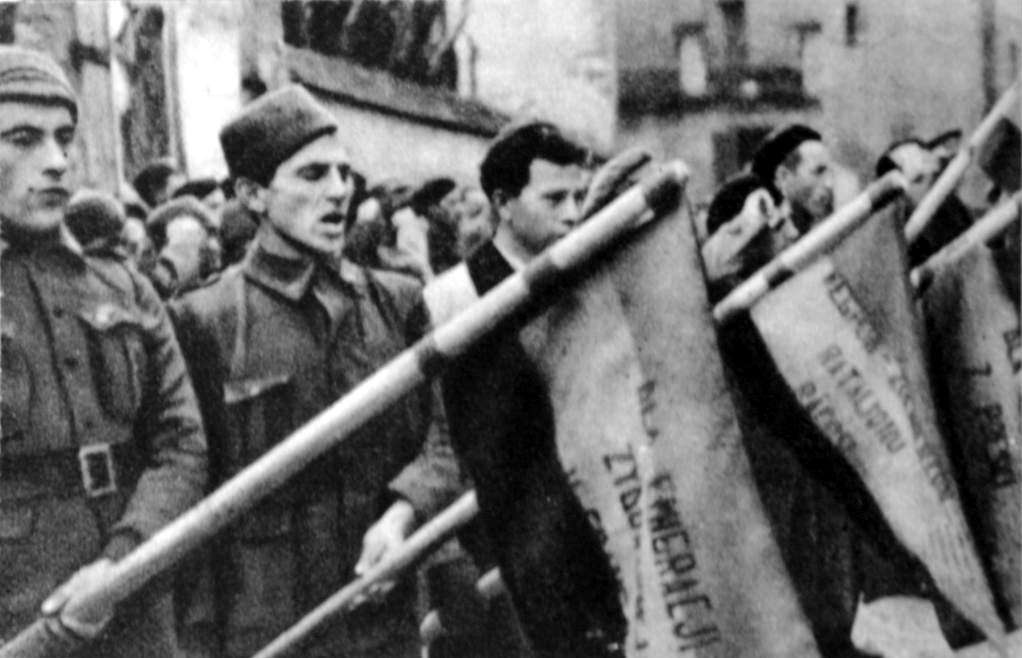
Polish International Brigades members in Barcelona

Although the derogatory use of polacos is not widely known in Poland, it is occasionally reported in the media. These reports often downplay or deny the offensive nature of the term. For example, an official publication from the Warsaw Ministry of Foreign Affairs merely stated that "in Catalonia, the Poles are approached with particular sympathy, since inhabitants of the region are traditionally nicknamed polacos."

News reports about polacos sometimes speculate on Poland being a model for Catalonia, with headlines like "Catalans are proud to be Poles." Some authors describe its derogatory use as a relic of the Franco era, emphasizing supposed Catalan admiration for Poland stemming from factors like popular Polish cartoons for kids, esteemed Polish writers, and a revered Polish history.

The topic of Catalans being inspired by Polish patriotism, independence movements, resistance against oppression, and the contribution of Polish interbrigadistas during the Spanish Civil War occasionally surfaces in Polish online discussions.

Reports that clearly identify polacos as a "pejorative-ironic" and frequently used slur are less common, usually appearing in discussions about the Real Madrid-FC Barcelona rivalry.

With the recent increase in Polish migration to Spain, including Catalonia, some Poles have encountered this usage. Like the Polish media, they often downplay its offensiveness, sometimes treating it humorously, such as by introducing themselves as Polacos de Polonia ('Poles from Poland').

A website run by Polish people from Barcelona describes the term as "slightly pejorative," but also "colloquial" and "with a slight wink." However, some Poles react angrily, condemning the term as an insult to the entire Polish nation.

== See also ==
- Anti-Catalan sentiment
- Polack
- Polaca
