= Muriwai (rangatira) =

Māori chief (?–1828)

Muriwai (died 1828), also known as Tuku Take, was a Māori rangatira (chief) of the Te Popoto hapū.

== Biography ==
In 1819, the missionaries Samuel Marsden, William Gilbert Puckey, and Thomas Kendall arrived in the Hokianga to find that Muriwai was involved in an altercation with his neighbour, Matangi, as Muriwai's pigs had ravaged Matangi's kumara fields. After the dispute was settled, Muriwai transported Marsden to Utakura, where Muriwai was mainly living at the time. Muriwai later provided a canoe to the missionaries for them to visit the Hokianga Heads, with he and his family accompanying them on the journey.

Muriwai continued to act as a "master of ceremonies" to the European settlers. In late March 1820, Muriwai was present when the schooner Prince Regent became the first known European vessel to traverse the sand bar at the Hokianga Heads. Muriwai subsequently declared the vessel tapu, ensuring that no one would board it without permission.

Muriwai had his fighting pā at Karewa ki Runga, near the Hokianga Harbour. He was noted as always having been opposed to Hongi Hika until 1826, when they fought together against Ngāti Whātua at Kaipara.

In November 1826, he was one of the sellers in Horeke to William Deloitte and William Stewart. James Herd was particularly impressed with Muriwai's mana, and his charts show Motukaraka as "Moodewy's place" and Ōnoke as "Moodewy's Point."

There are varying claims about Muriwai's death. Ruth Ross, writing for An Encyclopaedia of New Zealand, claimed that Muriwai was mortally wounded during a skirmish at Waimā in March 1828 when Te Whareumu was killed. Ross also stated that, upon his death, the leadership of the Te Popoto hapū was passed down to his younger brother, Makoare Te Taonui, a claim reiterated by the Ministry for Culture and Heritage. Ross alleged that 900 fighting men attended his funeral, in which the Muriwai was placed in a sitting position. On one side of the chief's body lay his weapons and on the other, the body of his youngest wife, who had strangled herself.

Conversely, Guy Scholefield's Dictionary of New Zealand Biography from 1940 claimed that Muriwai died in 1826, being killed during Te Wera's attack on Rangihoua, Māhia.
