= Polack (disambiguation) =

Polack is a derogatory reference to a person of Polish descent.

Polack may also refer to:

- Polack (surname)
- Polatsk, or Połack, a city in Belarus

== See also ==
- Pollack (disambiguation)
- Pollock (disambiguation)
- Polák
