= Pollak =

Pollak is an Austrian surname, and is a variant of Polak usually of Jewish Ashkenazic origin, it originates as an ethnic surname for Jews between Austria, Poland and Germany. Notable people with the surname include:

== Athletes ==
- Burglinde Pollak (born 1951), German athlete
- Egon Pollak (1898–1994), Austrian footballer
- James Howard Pollak Jr. (born 1963), American cyclist
- Jaroslav Pollák (born 1947), Slovak footballer
- Josef Pollák (born 1960), Czech orienteering competitor
- Mike Pollak (born 1985), American footballer
- Zoltán Pollák (born 1984), Hungarian footballer

== Other people ==
- Cheryl Pollak (born 1967), American actress
- Felix Pollak (1909–1987), American poet
- Henry O. Pollak (1927–2026), Austrian-American mathematician
- Jacob Pollak (c. 1460–1541), Polish rabbi
- Joachim Pollak (1798–1879), Austrian rabbi
- Joel Pollak (born 1977), American politician and author
- Jonathan Pollak (born 1982), Israeli anarchist
- Kaim Pollák (1835–1905), Hungarian writer
- Katherine Pollak Ellickson (1905–1996), American labor economist
- Kay Pollak (born 1938), Swedish film director
- Kevin Pollak (born 1957), American comedian and actor
- Leo Wenzel Pollak (1888–1964), Czech-Irish meteorologist
- Linsey Pollak, Australian musician and composer
- Louis H. Pollak (1922–2012), American district court judge and university dean
- Mimi Pollak (1903–1999), Swedish actress
- Oskar Pollak (1883–1915), Czech art historian
- Otto Pollak (1908–1998), American sociologist
- Seth Pollak, American psychologist
- Stuart R. Pollak (born 1937), American judge

== See also ==
- Pollack (disambiguation)
- Public Utilities Commission of the District of Columbia v. Pollak
- Shass Pollak, Jewish mnemonist group
