= George Barron Goodman =

19th-century Australian photographer

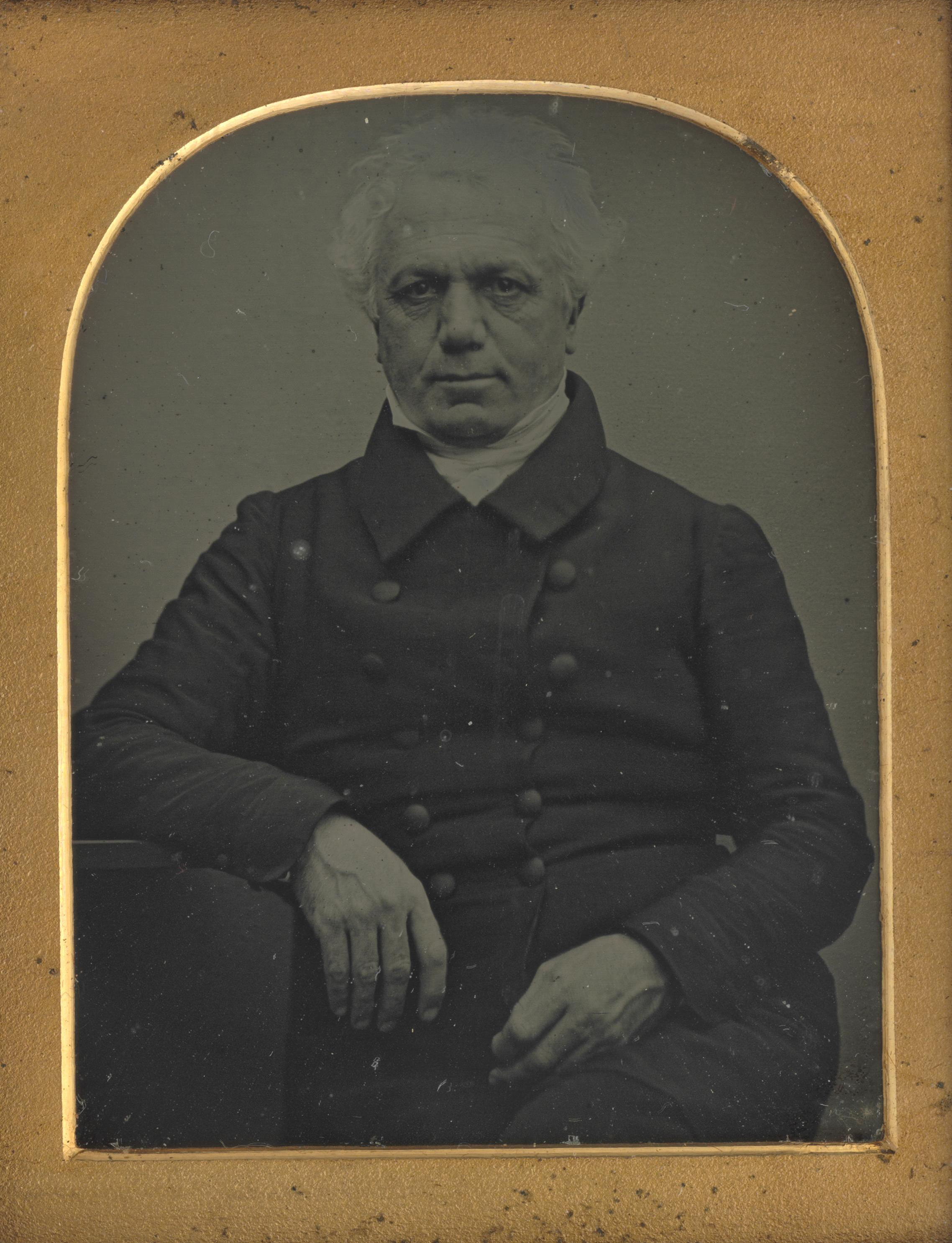
- Dr. William Bland by George Barron Goodman, Australia, 1844-1845.
- Born: Gershon Ben Avrahim; Unknown; London, England
- Died: 1851; Paris, France
- Education: Richard Beard
- Known for: Photography
- Partner: Sarah Polack

George Barron Goodman, also known as George Baron Goodman, was a practitioner of the Daguerreotype in the 1840s and Australia’s first professional photographer. He was also one of the first to hold the rights to use Daguerre's process in the British Colonies.

== Early life ==
George Barron Goodman was the son of A. Goodman of Nottingham Terrace, Regent's Park London. Geoffrey Batchen claims that "‘George Bar(r)on Goodman’ is an Anglicised inflection of Gershon Ben Avrahim, the daguerreotypist’s name by birth."

== Sydney, 1842 ==
After buying rights to use the daguerreotype process in the British Colonies from Richard Beard, Goodman set sail from England for Australia. In November 1842, he arrived in Sydney on board the Eden along with the requisite apparatus for taking daguerreotypes. On 12 December he set up the Colony’s first photographic studio on the roof of Sydney's then tallest building, the Royal Hotel, in George Street. Exposure times were around 30 seconds and images were processed and framed for the sitter in a few minutes. The studio itself was encased in blue glass, a feature which helped speed up exposure times due to the process's sensitivity to blue wavelengths of the light spectrum. The cost was around one guinea per image.

On 4 January 1843, Goodman married Sarah Polack who he appears to have met onboard the Eden while voyaging from England. The marriage took place at Charlotte Place, Sydney, the residence of her father, well-known Sydney emancipist and auctioneer Abraham Solomon Polack. Two weeks later, on 21 January, the Governor, Sir Gerorge Gipps, visited his rooftop studio, and along with his wife Elizabeth, had their likeness taken by Goodman. By March he had set up his apparatus to allow the taking of full length photos, group shots and landscapes.

== Hobart, 1843 ==
Unfortunately Goodman had arrived in Australia during one of the Colony’s first economic depressions. To make the most of his monopoly on the use of the daguerreotype Goodman was forced to travel widely. In August 1843 he and Sarah left Sydney for Hobart, Tasmania, where they set up a studio to take portraits there. Upon arriving in Hobart he found another photographer, Thomas Bock, was advertising the fact that he had the apparatus and skill to take daguerreotypes. In a letter to the editor of the Hobart Courier, Goodman made it clear he was the only person licensed to take daguerreotypes in Australia. Goodman set up his new studio in the garden of Mrs Wilmot’s boarding house on St. Patrick Street.

By November 1843 business was on the wane and Goodman, still in Hobart, was advertising his intention to leave for Kolkata, India and was offering photos at reduced prices. The following month he was preparing to leave for Port Phillip, Melbourne, in Victoria and try his fortunes there. However it appears he changed his plans so he could execute a series of landscape views of Hobart, a set of which was bought by James Ebenezer Bicheno, Colonial Secretary of Van Diemen's Land.

== Sydney, Windsor, Bathurst, 1844-1845 ==
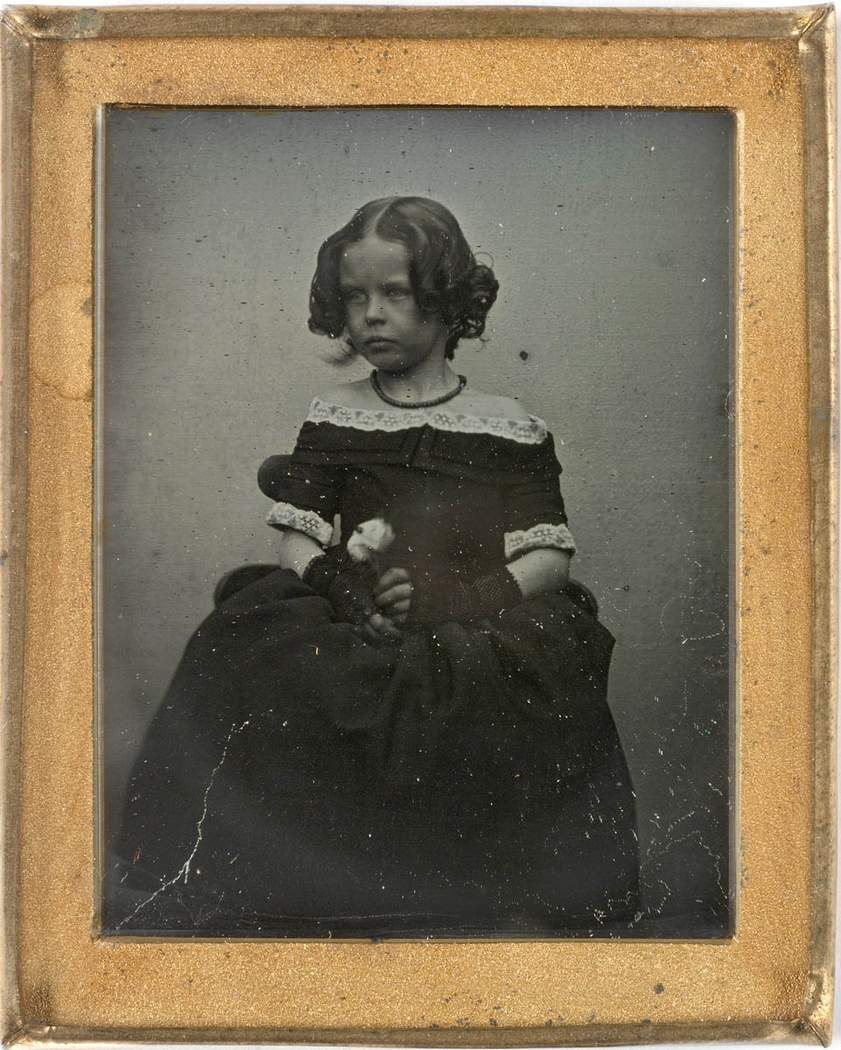
Sarah Ann Lawson, May 1845, by George Barron Goodman

Goodman and Sarah arrived back in Sydney, on the brig Caroline, in March 1844. On 21 June 1844, Sarah, gave birth to a daughter while at their residence at 49 Hunter Street Sydney. On 17 August 1844 Goodman announced he would be opening a new daguerreotype studio located at the back of his home and before this finally opened to the public in December 1844, he appears to have had a studio at 14 Hunter Street. A portrait would now cost the sitter 21 shillings. Full length portraits were still one guinea each.

By this time it appears Goodman’s daguerreotypes were greatly improved on the ones taken during his previous stay. In particular, correspondents noted that the horizontal lines left by the polishing machine on his earlier photos were almost completely removed in the newer ones. Other improvements meant Goodman no longer needed to rely on taking images in the ‘blue chamber' as improvements in the emulsions sensitivity meant they could now be taken outside on a fine day. Examples of Goodman’s work from this period include portraits of Mr Siddons the keeper of the light-house at South Head and Captain Underwood. In November 1844 Richard Beard sent instructions to Goodman on how to colourise daguerreotypes. This new offering was immediately added to his advertisements, and sold for one guinea each. By January 1845, Goodman’s new portraits of Dr William Bland, Dr. Bennett, Mr. Mort, and other well-known Sydney-siders could be viewed at a variety of establishments in George-street. A photograph of Dr Bland taken around this time has been identified by photography historian Alan Davies as the earliest extant photograph taken in Australia. Over the course of May and June 1845 Goodman travelled to Bathurst and Windsor in Regional New South Wales where he secured numerous portraits. In May he appears to have visited 'Veteran Hall', in Prospect. This was the property of the Lawson family and he made a number of portraits while there. Some of these are now held by the State Library of New South Wales.

== Melbourne, Adelaide, 1845 ==
Searching for new business, Goodman arrived in Melbourne on board the Thistle on 30 July 1845. However, before he could announce his services to the public he needed to find a place to set up his equipment. By 6 August he had secured premises in the stores of Mr Wesby in Flinders Lane. It was also rumoured he would travel to Gellong if there were enough subscribers.

Sarah and his daughter arrived in Melbourne on 7 October but things don’t appear to have worked out as well as Goodman had hoped. In November he was involved in a stoush after challenging Dr. Gilbert, Secretary to the Mechanics' Institution, about his intention to take daguerreotype portraits at his property in Eastern Hills, partly because Goodman felt he was still the sole owner of right to use the process. In December 1845, the Goodmans abruptly left Melbourne for Adelaide, South Australia. After a stay of only four months Goodman appears to have made around £870 from daguerreotype sales. While in Melbourne he appears to have taken portraits of First Nations People, and these were reported in the Launceston Examiner as being of high quality.

The family arrived in Adelaide on 9 January 1846, and while there he stayed with Mr. Solomon. In March the South Australian Register tried to dispel the rumours he had left Melbourne without paying his debts. Messrs. Norman and Hesseltine had been taking daguerreotypes in Adelaide prior to Goodman’s arrival but sitters still flocked to have their picture taken. In just three days Goodman is reputed to have taken 80 portraits.

== Sydney, Newcastle, Maitland, 1846-1850 ==
Goodman returned to Sydney on 18 March and by April he was working out of a new studio at 321 Castlereagh Street. This was equipped with the latest in artistic backdrops for framing his sitters and included Australian scenes such as the ‘Squatters Run’. On Saturdays Goodman devoted his time to photographing buildings and views, with a particular emphasis on commissioned work for proprietors of houses and businesses.

In September 1846 Goodman was commissioned to take photographs of buildings in Newcastle and from the 15th to the 22nd took portraits at Farquharson's Hotel. Goodman’s next visit to the area was Maitland, where in November 1846, he set up his apparatus in George Yeoman's Hotel. By December he was back in Sydney having completed his excursion north.

Life as a photographer must have made it difficult to maintain a stable family life, and it seems it was increasingly hard for Goodman to maintain a monopoly on the process. On 4 June 1847 Sarah gave birth to her second daughter at their premises in Castlereagh Street. On 9 June Goodman publicly announced he had sold his interest in his photography business to his brother-in-law Isaack Polack, who had been managing the Castlereagh Street studio for the past three years. In July Goodman started his new career as the owner of the Circular Quay Hotel. In November 1848, Goodman moved to Eden (Twofold Bay) and set up as an auctioneer and store-owner. He returned to Sydney in December the following year to briefly run the daguerreotype operation for Isaac Polack. Goodman apparently left Sydney, for England, in 1850, but it seems, without his wife and daughters. A year later on 2 June 1851, Goodman died in Paris after a short illness.
