= William Pollack =

William Pollack may refer to:

- William Pollack (immunologist), British-born American immunologist
- William E. Pollack, member of the Illinois House of Representatives
- William S. Pollack, author of the 1998 nonfiction book about boyhood and boy culture Real Boys

== See also ==
- William Pollock (disambiguation)
- Bill Pollack, American racing driver
