= Judge Pollak =

Judge Pollak or Pollack may refer to:

- Cheryl Pollak (judge) (born 1953), magistrate judge of the United States District Court for the Eastern District of New York
- Louis H. Pollak (1922–2012), judge of the United States District Court for the Eastern District of Pennsylvania
- Milton Pollack (1906–2004), judge of the United States District Court for the Southern District of New York

== See also ==
- John Calvin Pollock (1857–1937), judge of the United States District Court for the District of Kansas
- Justice Pollock (disambiguation)
