= Elizabeth Polack =

English playwright

- Born: 1813
- Died: 1889 (aged 75–76); Birmingham
- Occupation: Playwright
- Relatives: Maria Polack and Lipman Polack (parents) ; Martha Polack (sister)
- Writing career
- Language: English
- Years active: 1830—1843
- Subject: Melodrama
- Notable works: Esther, the Royal Jewess (1835); St. Clair of the Isles (1838)

Elizabeth Polack was an English playwright of the 1830s, notable for being the first Jewish woman melodramatist in England.

== Life and works ==
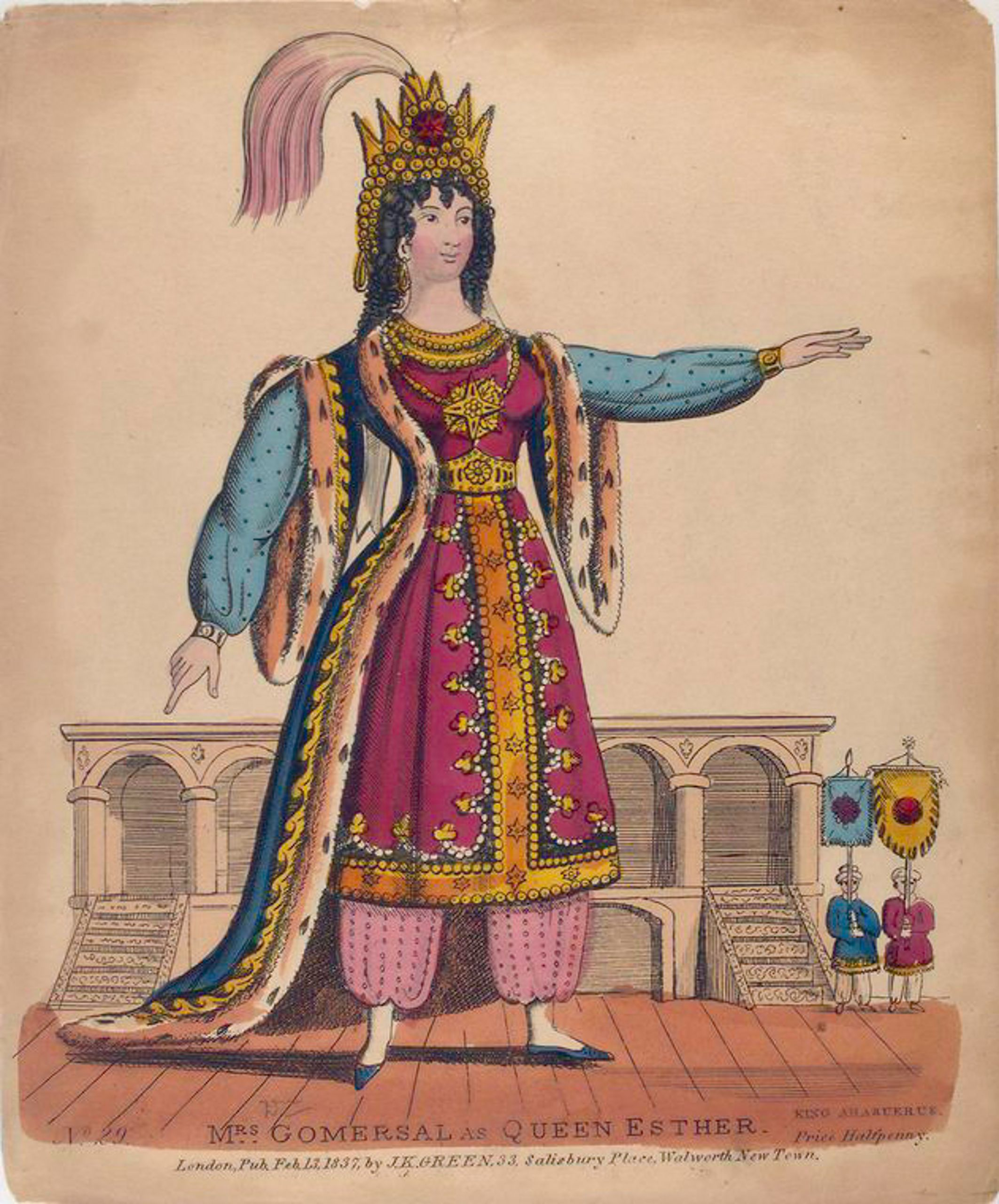
Mrs Gomersal as Queen Esther in King Anasuerus (London: J.K. Green, 1837) (NYPL)

Few historical records survive which detail Elizabeth Polack's life. She was born in London in 1813 and died on the 18th of October in 1889 in Birmingham. She was a playwright in London between 1830 and 1838 remains. Contemporary records credit her with seven plays, only two of which, Esther, the Royal Jewess; or The Death of Haman and St. Clair of the Isles; or The Outlaw of Barra, have survived. Alberti; or the Mines of Idria was performed at the Royal Pavilion on 10 May 1834 is believed to be by Polack. At the time, this play was incorrectly advertised as Alberti, or, the Mines of India in some publications. Esther, with a story taken from the Old Testament, a version of the tradtitonal Jewish Purimshpil and considered in its time to be a type of an "Exotic East" melodrama, was successfully produced in 1835 at London's Royal Pavilion Theatre, Whitechapel in the East End (the Pavilion was later a centre for Yiddish theatre in London). Her St. Clair, however, based on an 1803 novel by Elizabeth Helme, met, when it debuted at the [Royal] Victoria Theatre in 1838, with a modest reception. It is apparently the source of the melodramatic cliché, "Foiled again!"

Polack's mother, Maria Polack, was one of the first Anglo-Jewish novelists. Polack may have also been related to Joel Samuel Polack, author of two well-received travel books about New Zealand. Joel's biographer writes that he lived with his sister in Piccadilly when he first returned to England; that sister may have been Elizabeth. Such a family background would have offered support to her writing career, even from her position within a marginalized community.

She wrote short novels, poems for The New Monthly Belle Assemblée between 1839 and 1843.

== Plays by Elizabeth Polack ==
- Woman's Revenge (1832; attributed by some sources to John Howard Payne)
- Alberti; or The Mines of Idria (1834, no copy known to exist)
- Esther, the Royal Jewess; or The Death of Haman (1835)
- Echo; or the Whisper of Westminster Bridge (1835)
- The Golden Shield; or Days of Numa Pompilius (1836)
- St. Clair of the Isles; or The Outlaw of Barra (1838)
- Angeline; or The Golden Chain (no date, no copy known to exist)

== Notes & references ==
=== References ===
- Brown, Susan, et al. "Elizabeth Polack." Orlando: Women’s Writing in the British Isles from the Beginnings to the Present. Ed. Susan Brown, Patricia Clements, and Isobel Grundy. Cambridge University Press. Cambridge UP, n.d. 22 Mar. 2013. Accessed 17 Sept. 2022.
- Conway, David (2012). Jewry in Music. Cambridge: Cambridge University Press. ISBN 9781107015388
- Franceschina, John. "Introduction to Elizabeth Polack's Esther ". British Women Playwrights Around 1800, 11 paragraphs. 15 October 2000.
- Franceschina, John Charles (1997). Sisters of Gore: seven Gothic melodramas by British women, 1790-1843. Taylor & Francis. pp. 227–284. ISBN 9780815317814.
- Weltman, Sharon Aronofsky (2018). ""Women Playwrights and the London Stage"". In Hartley, Lucy; Batchelor, Jennie (eds.). The History of British Women's Writing, 1830–1880. Palgrave Macmillan. p. 204. ISBN 978-1-137-58465-6.
