= Polaschek =

Polaschek is a surname, a German spelling of Polášek. Notable people with the surname include:

- Devon Polaschek, New Zealand professor of psychology
- Martin Polaschek (born 1965), Austrian legal scholar and politician
