= Antonino Barges =

Franco-Flemish composer

Antonino Barges, sometimes given as Antonino Bargues, (fl. 1546–1565) was a Franco-Flemish composer of the Renaissance, active in Venice and Treviso. While known as a composer of light popular secular forms such as the villotta, he also wrote motets and a Requiem. He was a friend and probably a student of Adrian Willaert, the founder of the Venetian School, and was listed as a witness to Willaert's last will and testament.

Little is known about his early life. He was born in Barges. Like many of his countrymen, he received a good musical education in the Low Countries, and either in youth or early adulthood came to Italy, where employment prospects for singers and composers were better than at home. By 1550 he had become maestro di cappella (choirmaster) at the church of Santa Maria Gloriosa dei Frari (known as the Ca' Grande) in Venice, a prestigious post. He left Venice in 1555, going to Treviso, where he became a Franciscan and joined the convent of San Francesco. Further records show that he was employed at Treviso Cathedral between 1562 and 1565 as maestro di cappella. No further records of his life have yet been found, and he has not yet been the subject of a dedicated scholarly biography.

Barges venerated his teacher and friend Willaert, and mentioned him glowingly in the dedication to his first book of villotte (Di Antonino Barges maestro di cappella alla Casa grande di Venetia il primo libro de villotte a quatro voci con un'altra canzon della galina novamente da lui composte & date in luce, Venice: Gardano, 1550): "l'unico inventore della vera e buona musica" ("the sole inventor of music which is true and good.") Indeed, friendship is a theme of the dedication: in addition to the reference to Willaert, Barges characterizes his relationship with Girolamo Fenaruolo, the dedicatee, as a friendship, and mentions their mutual friends Stefano Taberio and Marco Silvio. If Barges's dedication is to be believed, these men were among the first to hear and sing his songs, but the songs might also have found a home in Domenico Venier's salon.

Barges published only this one book of light secular music, although it contains music besides villottas such as a dozen villanescas and four madrigals not by Barges but by Andrea Patricio (composers at this time often admitted a few works by others into their publications). Other music by Barges included some sacred works, including two motets for four voices, published in 1563, an Alleluia, and a Requiem for four voices (not dated). It is not known if he wrote this for Willaert. The style of the secular music is as light as anything found in northern Italy at the time: dancelike, quick, often triple meter, and often with nonsense syllables in a "patter" style.

Barges also wrote three instrumental ricercars.
