= William Pollock =

William Pollock may refer to:

- William P. Pollock (1870–1922), United States Senator from South Carolina
- William H. K. Pollock (1859–1896), English chess master
- William Pollock (priest) (1812–1873), Archdeacon of Chester
- William Pollock (cricketer) (1886–1972), Irish cricketer
- William Pollock (unionist) (1899–1982), American labor union leader
- Sir William Frederick Pollock, 2nd Baronet (1815–1888), British barrister and author

== See also ==
- William Pollack (disambiguation)
- Bill Pollack (1925–2017), American racing driver
