= Polloc =

Polloc may refer to the following places in the Philippines:

- Polloc, a barangay of the municipality of Parang, Maguindanao del Norte
- Polloc Port, in Parang, Maguindanao del Norte
- Polloc Harbor, a bay off the coast of Maguindanao del Norte
- Polloc Commandancy, a former commandancy that was part of the Cotabato District of the Spanish Empire
- Polloc Islet, part of the municipality of Banton, Romblon, Philippines

== See also ==
- Polloc and Govan Railway
- Pollock (disambiguation)
