= Yuriy Polyakov =

Russian-American scientist

Yuriy Sergeyevich Polyakov (Russian: Юрий Сергеевич Поляков, born September 3, 1980, in Moscow, Soviet Union) is a Russian-American scientist at Duality Technologies. He is best known for his work in cryptography (homomorphic encryption, lattice-based cryptography), chemical engineering (theory of filtration processes, mathematical modeling of chemical reactors), and physics (stochastic time series analysis).

== Biography ==
Polyakov wrote his first scientific paper when he was a freshman student at the Moscow State University of Environmental Engineering. In April 1998, he moved to the United States. Polyakov received a Bachelor of Science in computer information systems summa cum laude from Excelsior College in 2002 and Master of Science in computer science from New Jersey Institute of Technology in 2003, where he carried out scientific research in computer science and computational mathematics. In 2004, he defended his PhD dissertation in Chemical Engineering at the Moscow State University of Environmental Engineering. In 2006, Polyakov started scientific cooperation with Serge Timashev in the analysis of stochastic time series (Flicker-Noise Spectroscopy). In 2007, he defended the DSc dissertation in Physics and Mathematics at the Karpov Institute of Physical Chemistry, Moscow, Russia.

== Scientific achievements ==
Main results in chemical engineering include the development of a novel filtration process – depth membrane filtration, systematic study of nonuniform particle deposition on the inner and outer surfaces of ultrafiltration and microfiltration membranes, and mathematical modeling of coupled heat and mass transfer with chemical conversions. Main results in computer science and computational mathematics include the development of an approximate method for nonlinear differential and integrodifferential equations and development of a feedback algorithm for switch location with application to network design. Serge Timashev and Yuriy Polyakov developed a phenomenological theory for the analysis of natural time and space series with stochastically varying components, Flicker-Noise Spectroscopy, that may be used for problems such as the diagnosis of health conditions and earthquake prediction. Most significant results in cryptography include the development of efficient algorithms for homomorphic encryption and application of homomorphic encryption for privacy-preserving genomic analysis.

== Software ==
He is a co-author and project lead for the PALISADE open-source lattice cryptography software library. He is also a co-author of the Flicker-Noise Spectroscopy toolkit for time and space series analysis.

== Honors and awards ==
He received Moscow Mayor's Young Scientist Award in 2005. Listed in multiple biographical reference books.
