= Polack =

Derogatory word used for a Polish person

In the contemporary English language, the noun Polack (/ˈpoʊlɑːk/ and /-læk/) is a derogatory term, primarily used in North America, referring to a person of Polish origin. It is an anglicisation of the Polish masculine noun Polak, which denotes a person of Polish ethnicity and typically male gender. However, the English loanword is considered an ethnic slur.

== History ==
According to Online Etymology Dictionary by Douglas Harper, Polack meant as "Polish immigrant, person of Polish descent" was used in American English until the late 19th century (1879) to describe a "Polish person" in a non-offensive way (1574). Dictionary.com Unabridged (v 1.1) based on the Unabridged Dictionary by Random House claims that the word originated between 1590 and 1600. For example, in Shakespeare's tragedy Hamlet, the character Horatio uses the term Polacks to refer to the opponents of Hamlet's father:

Such was the very armour he had on
When he the ambitious Norway combated;
So frown'd he once, when, in an angry parle,
He smote the sledded Polacks on the ice.

In an Irish-published edition of Hamlet by the Educational Company, Patrick Murray noted: "Some editors, however, argue that Polacks should read as pole-axe, and that Horatio is remembering an angry Old Hamlet striking the ice with his battle-axe".

On 26 July 2008, The Times featured a comment piece by restaurant reviewer and columnist Giles Coren entitled "Two waves of immigration, Poles apart", where he used Polack to describe Polish immigrants who can "clear off", in reference to such immigrants leaving the UK in response to low-paying construction jobs drying up.

== Ethnonyms ==
The neutral English language noun for a Polish person (male or female) today is Pole (see also: Naming Poland in foreign languages). In some other languages such as Swedish, Norwegian or Scots, polack or polakk are inoffensive terms for a person from Poland.

In Iberian languages, polaco is a mild slur for people from Catalonia, though it is a completely neutral way of referring to Polish people in all Ibero-American countries except Brazil, where it became a politically incorrect term, and the noun used for Polish people nowadays is polonês (such term is absent from Spanish and other Portuguese variants).

In Ukrainian, the old exonym лях (lyakh, lyakhy) is now considered offensive In Russian the same word, formerly often used with negative connotations but not generally offensive, is obsolete. In both languages it was replaced by the neutral поляк (polyak).

Another common Russian ethnic slur for Poles is пшек (pshek), an onomatopoeia derived from Polish phonology: prepositions prze- and przy- are quite common, with rz corresponding to the sound of "zh", and the sibilant-sounding speech (e.g., przepraszam ("excuse me") transcribed as "pzheprasham") has been a target of mockery in Russian culture.

In Polish, the term polaczek (sometimes capitalised as Polaczek; plural: polaczki) which is the diminutive of the word polak is seen as a disrespectful or offensive term for a Polish person. In Polish-language media, it is usually also used as a direct translation for English term Polack.

== See also ==
- Anti-Polish sentiment
- Polish joke, at times referred to as "Polack joke"
