= Poļakovs =

Poļakovs (feminine: Poļakova) is the Latvianization of the Russian surnamre Polyakov. Notable people with the surname include:

- Michael Polakovs (1923–2009), American clown
- Nikolajs Poļakovs, Latvian footballer
- Nikolajs Poļakovs, birth name of Nicolai Poliakoff (1900–1974), Russian, Soviet, and British clown
- Samanta Tīna Poļakova, better known as Samanta Tīna (born 1989), Latvian singer
