= Alessandro Orologio =

Italian composer

Alessandro Orologio (also Alexander Horologius) (1551–1633) was an Italian composer and instrumentalist, who lived in German lands.

Orologio's first appearance on record is as a trumpeter in the court of Rudolf II at Prague around 1580. He remained there until 1613, and was named vice-kapellmeister in 1603, though he also traveled widely. In a 1594 visit to Kassel, he met famed lutenist John Dowland. His propensity for travel resulted in the mistaken impression (first proposed by Robert Eitner) that there were two Alessandro Orologios. After 1613 Orologio received a pension in Prague, and continued to work at Steyr and Garsten.

Orologio won fame in his day as an instrumental musician able to perform and compose in a variety of genres. He was an adept composer for voices, and his works are marked by closely spaced imitation. He made little use of chromaticism, which was in fashion in his day.

His works were collected and edited by F. Colussi in 1992.

== Works ==
- Il primo libro de madrigali (Venice, 1586, 5 voices)
- Il secondo libro de madrigali (Dresden, 1589, 4–6 voices)
- Canzonette, libro I (Venice, 1593)
- Canzonette, libro II (Venice, 1594)
- Il secondo libro de madrigali (Venice, 1595, 4–6 voices)
- Canzonette (Venice, 1596, 3 voices)
- Intradae (Helmstaedt, 1597, 5–6 instruments)
- Miserere mei Deus (1611, 5 voices)
- Several madrigals published in anthologies
- Further sacred and secular works in manuscripts
