= Eden (1826 ship) =

History

United Kingdom
- Name: Eden
- Owner: Colvile Wedderburn & Co.
- Builder: Fletcher, Son & Fearnall
- Launched: 1826

General characteristics
- Tons burthen: 513 (bm)
- Length: 123 ft 9 in (37 m)
- Beam: 30 ft 8 in (9.4 m)
- Propulsion: Sail

Eden was a 513-ton merchant ship built by Fletcher, Son & Fearnall at Union Dock upon the Thames River, England in 1826. The ship was built for Colvile Wedderburn & Co. and named after the family of Andrew Colvile's second wife, the influential Eden family.

Eden initially sailed between England and the sugar plantations of the West Indies for Colvile Wedderburn & Co. From 1836, after changing ownership to Joseph Somes, she made several voyages transporting convicts from England to Australia. After a second change of ownership to John Luscombe in 1846, Eden transported settlers to South Australia and New Zealand.

== Career ==
Under the command of Alexander Mollison and surgeon Gilbert King, she left Portsmouth, England on 31 August 1836, with 280 male convicts. She arrived in Hobart Town on 22 December 1836 and had three deaths en route. Eden departed Hobart Town on 7 January 1837, arriving on 14 January 1837 with 22 prisoners from Cape of Good Hope. She left Port Jackson on 2 February 1837 bound for Batavia.

On her second convict voyage under the command of Henry Naylor and surgeon George Freeman, she left Sheerness, England on 10 July 1840, with 270 male convicts. She arrived in Sydney on 18 November and had one death en route. Eden departed Port Jackson in February 1841, bound for Batavia.
