= Polaca =

Polaca may refer to:

- Polača, two villages in Croatia
- Polacca, 17th-century sailing vessel
- Polaca, in Brazilian Portuguese the word (meaning "Polish woman") became synonymous to "prostitute"
