= Sergey Polyakov =

Sergey Vladimirovich Polyakov (Russian: Сергей Владимирович Поляков, born May 3, 1951, in Kharkiv, Ukrainian SSR, Soviet Union) is a Russian-American scientist performing research for USPolyResearch. He is best known for his R&D in space technology and chemical engineering including the theoretical and experimental studies of the performance of life support systems (LSS) for Soviet interplanetary spaceships and the MIR and ALPHA orbital stations using a ground-based Martian expedition real-scaled simulator on YouTube in the Institute for Biomedical Problems (Russian Space Agency Center). Developed an integrated approach to the design of air revitalization and water reclamation/conditioning system from human wastes on the basis of energy-efficient membrane and depth-filtration methods (membrane evaporation, ultra/micro filtration, reverse osmosis).

== Biography ==
Sergey Polyakov received MS in engineering physics from the Kharkiv Polytechnical Institute (1974), PhD in space technology from the Institute for Biomedical Problems (Moscow, 1982). His major job track record includes the leading engineer and research consultant in the LSS department of the Institute for Biomedical Problems (1978 to 1985, 1992 to 1997); head of laboratory at the All-Union Electrotechnical Institute, Moscow (1985 to 1987), senior researcher at the All-Russian Nuclear Power Engineering Research and Development Institute, Moscow (1987 to 1992), and researcher at USPolyResearch, US (2002 to present).
