= Justice Pollock =

Justice Pollock may refer to:

- John Calvin Pollock (1857–1937), associate justice of the Supreme Court of Kansas
- Stewart G. Pollock (born 1932), associate justice of the New Jersey Supreme Court

== See also ==
- Richard W. Pollack (born 1950), associate justice of the Supreme Court of Hawaii
- Judge Pollak (disambiguation)
