= Artur Pollok =

Polish economist

Artur Pollok Ph.D.
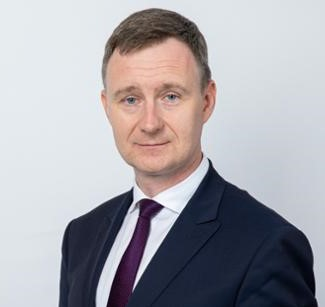

Poland Ambassador to FAO, WFP, IFAD
- In office 2016–2024

Personal details
- Born: 7 April 1972 (age 54) Kraków
- Spouse: Katarzyna Dagmara Pollok
- Children: 2
- Education: Kraków Academy of Economics
- Profession: economist

Artur Andrzej Pollok (born 7 April 1972 in Kraków) is a Polish economist who serves as a permanent representative to the FAO, WFP, IFAD, and United Nations in Rome (2016–2024).

== Life ==
Pollok in 1991 graduated from economic high school in Kraków. The same year, he won the national Economic Knowledge Contest. Between 1991 and 1996 he was studying banking and finance, specialisation: banking, at the Kraków Academy of Economics, receiving a master's degree. He was studying also about Pope John Paul II life and philosophy at the Tischner European University in Kraków. In 2005, he defended his Ph.D. thesis in economics.

In 1995, while still being a student, he began his professional career as an assistant at the Department of Microeconomics, Faculty of Finance of the Kraków Academy of Economics. Following years, he was promoted to the post of assistant professor.

In 1996, Pollok became an ordinary member of the Polish Economic Society, from 2005 to 2015 being its vice president and secretary of the Branch Board in Kraków. From 1995 to 2015 he was member of the Economic Knowledge Contest Head Committee, since 2004 deputy head of the committee.

In 2016, he was appointed the Permanent Representative of Poland to the Food and Agriculture Organization, the World Food Programme, and the International Fund for Agricultural Development in Rome. He ended his mission in July 2024.

In February 2023, he was elected President of World Food Programme Executive Board.

Besides Polish, he speaks English, Italian and Russian languages. He is married to Katarzyna Dagmara Pollok, with two daughters.

== Honours ==
- 2007 – Medal of the National Education Commission
- 2007 – Bronze Cross of Merit
- 2011 – Silver Cross of Merit
