= Otto Pollak =

American writer and academic

Otto Pollak (30 April 1908 – 18 April 1998) was a writer and a professor of Sociology at the University of Pennsylvania.

His most controversial and famous book was The Criminality of Women (1950), in which he suggested that women commit just as much crime as men, but that their crime is more easily hidden. Pollak further argued that the criminal justice system was biased by preconceptions about women and did not convict or sentence women as harshly as men. His empirical work has provided a starting point for criminology on women. His work has also been used in political debates, as some antifeminist or masculist groups have appropriated his work.
