= Boris Poliakov =

Russian scientist

Boris Poliakov Борис Поляков
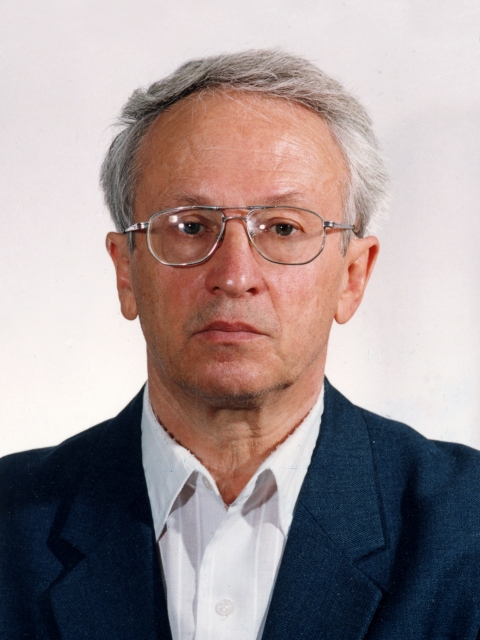
- Born: Boris Nikolaevich Poliakov; Борис Николаевич Поляков; May 17, 1938 (age 88); Nizhny Tagil, Sverdlovsk region, Russian Federation of the former Soviet Union
- Education: Ural Polytechnic Institute
- Spouse: Irina Nafanayilovna Poliakova (m. 1968)
- Children: Tatiana and Ekaterina, three grandchildren
- Awards: Member of the Academy of Engineering Sciences of the Russian Federation Medal “Inventor of the USSR”
- Scientific career
- Fields: Automation, process optimization, statistical analysis in metallurgy

Boris Nikolaevich Poliakov (Russian: Борис Николаевич Поляков; born May 17, 1938, in Nizhny Tagil, Russia) is a Russian scientist, professor of Mechanical Engineering, and member of the Academy of Engineering Sciences of the Russian Federation.

Boris N. Poliakov is known for his work in the field of ferrous metallurgy. His areas of expertise include the theory and technologies of metal forming, metal elasticity and plasticity, and application of computer technology and mathematical modeling in computer-aided design and process optimization of hot rolling mills.

Poliakov pioneered several advances in the metallurgy of the USSR, including the development and application of the first software suites for optimization of rolling technologies, equipment and electric drives of rolling mills. He was a key member of the engineering team in charge of the design of the first radial and curved continuous casting machines in the Soviet Union.

His research on the basis of the finite element method led to a significant improvement in the strength, thermal resistance, operational reliability and durability of rolling mill components of complex design, and the reduction of metal consumption in their manufacturing. The software suites developed under his leadership formed the foundation of a system of automated design for rolling mills at the capital equipment production facility Uralmash, and led to the development of a number of fundamentally new engineering solutions.

Boris N. Poliakov was one of the lead engineers behind the development of the first computer system of data acquisition and diagnostics used in Soviet metallurgy for the automation of rolling technologies and operating regimes of rolling equipment. In the 1960s, he and his research team developed some of the first prototypes of mechatronics by integrating microprocessors into the system of drive control in complex, dynamically loaded mechanisms of rolling mills.

In the 1960s and early 1970s, he was a lead implementation manager responsible for the design and enhancement of process automation systems of the most productive blooming mill in the world - Blooming Mill 1300 with an annual production capacity of 6 million tons of ingots at Kryvorizhstal steel company (now ArcelorMittal Kryvyi Rih).

In the 1970s, Poliakov co-authored the second in the USSR mathematical statistics software suite, which, alongside system analysis, became widely used in algorithm engineering for optimal automatic operation of reversible rolling mills.

== Education ==
Boris N. Poliakov graduated from the department of Metallurgical Equipment Engineering at the Ural Polytechnic Institute in Sverdlovsk (now Yekaterinburg) in 1960. In 1972, he received his Ph.D. in Technical Sciences (Russian: кандидат технических наук). In 1992, the Higher Attestation Commission conferred on him the degree of Doctor of Science (Russian: доктор технических наук; equivalent to a higher doctorate degree).

== Career ==
During 1961-1989, Poliakov held positions with increasing responsibilities as a design engineer, senior research fellow and from 1974 until 1986, as the head of Hot Rolling Mills Applied Research Laboratory at the Uralmash Research Institute. From 1989 until 2002, he was the Chair of the Department of Design Automation and Engineering Graphics at the Russian State Vocational University (now Russian State Vocational Pedagogical University) in Yekaterinburg.

== Achievements ==
Boris N. Poliakov is a recipient of 30 inventor's certificates and patents registered in the USA, England, France, Belgium, Austria, Italy, Canada, Japan. He is the author of nearly 400 scientific publications in Russia and other countries, including six monographs in the collection of the Library of Congress.

Although formally retired, Poliakov continues to publish and participates in international conferences, such as Modernization of Russian Metallurgy (March 2006, Moscow), Material Deformation and Failure (November 2006, October 2007, Moscow), Reliability and Safety of Capital Equipment (October 26–29, 2015, Dnipropetrovsk).

The achievements of Boris N. Poliakov are featured in the Famous Scientists of Russia and in the Free Encyclopedia of the Ural region of Russia.

== Awards and honors ==
- Diploma Honorary Scientist of Europe with a commemorative medal (a/k/a the Gottfried Wilhelm von Leibniz medal) awarded by the Presidium of the European Academy of Natural Sciences in Hanover (Europäische Akademie der Naturwissenschaften Hannover) – December 2009.
- Member of the Academy of Engineering Sciences of the Russian Federation (Diploma № 600) – November 2000.
- Medal Inventor of the USSR – 1984.

== Notable publications ==
- Kotsar S.L.; Poliakov B.N.; Makarov Yu.D.; Chichigin V.A. (1974). Statistical Analysis and Mathematical Modeling of a Blooming Mill. Metallurgy Publishing Company, Moscow.
- Poliakov B.N.; Nyashin Yu.I.; Volegov I.F.; Trusov A.F. (1990). Loading, Load-Carrying Capacity, and Durability of Rolling Mills. Metallurgy Publishing Company, Moscow. ISBN 5-229-00302-2 (TS340.N281990).
- Poliakov, Boris (1993). Improving the Technologies and Durability of Rolling Mills: Part I. Yekaterinburg. ISBN 5-230-06636-9 (TS340.P5951994).
- Poliakov, Boris (1994). Improving the Technologies and Durability of Rolling Mills: Part II. Yekaterinburg. ISBN 5-230-06636-9 (TS340.P5951994).
- Poliakov, Boris (2006). Improving the Technologies, Load Carrying Capacity, Durability of Equipment, and Effectiveness of Automatic Systems in Rolling Mills: Part I. Renome Publishing Company, St. Petersburg. ISBN 5-98947-021-5 (TS340.P5962006).
- Poliakov, Boris (2007). Statistical Methods in Algorithms and Case Studies (Based on Rolling Mills Operation). Renome Publishing Company, St. Petersburg. ISBN 978-5-98947-081-5 (QA276.P5782007).
