= Alexander Polyakov =

Alexander Polyakov may refer to:

- Alexander Dmitriyevich Polyakov (born 1959), Russian diplomat and ambassador
- Alexander Markovich Polyakov (born 1945), Russian physicist
- Alexander Polyakov (artist) (1801–1835), Russian painter, mainly known for his portraits
- Alexander Polyakov (politician) (born 1969), Russian politician
- Alexander Polyakov, member of Russian music group PPK (trance duo)
