= Oskar Pollak =

Czech art historian (1883–1915)

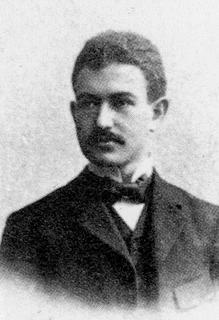
Oskar Pollak

Oskar Pollak (5 September 1883 – 11 June 1915) was a Czech art historian.

== Life ==
Pollak was born in Prague on 5 September 1883. He was a classmate and possible lover of Franz Kafka at the Altstädter Gymnasium (letters from Kafka to Pollak potentially imply some sort of romantic or sexual relationship between the two). After graduation from school, he briefly studied chemistry at the Faculty of Science of the German-language section of Charles University (the Deutsche Karl-Ferdinands-Universität) in Prague, before switching to the Faculty of Arts where he studied philosophy, archeology and art history. In the summer semester 1903, he was appointed as rapporteur of the literary arts section. Kafka took over this function, when in 1903 Pollak accepted a temporary job as a tutor at Horní Studenec Castle at Ždírec.

Pollak received his PhD in 1907 for a treatise about the Baroque sculptors Jan Brokoff and Ferdinand Brokoff. The same year he married Hedwig Eisner in Prague.

Pollak wrote numerous studies of art history, especially on the Renaissance and the Baroque. From 1910 to 1913, he worked first as an assistant lecturer, after his habilitation as a private lecturer in art history at the University of Vienna. When he was offered the position of secretary of art history at the Austrian Institute for Historical Research in Rome, Pollak left Vienna and went with his wife to Italy.

At the beginning of the First World War he volunteered. He died on 11 June 1915 on the Austro-Italian front on the Isonzo. Oskar Pollak left an extensive art historical estate, which was published in the late 1920s. Many of his publications are preserved in the library of the Royal Dutch Institute in Rome. Part of his private library was a large collection of topographical descriptions of and guidebooks to Rome, on which Ludwig Schudt based his bibliography Le Guide di Roma, published in 1930.
