= Real Boys =

1998 book by William S. Pollack

Real Boys: Rescuing Our Sons from the Myths of Boyhood
- Cover of the first edition
- Author: William S. Pollack
- Language: English
- Subject: Boyhood
- Publisher: Owl Books
- Publication date: 1998
- Publication place: United States
- Media type: Print (Paperback)
- Pages: 480
- ISBN: 978-0805061833

Real Boys: Rescuing Our Sons from the Myths of Boyhood is a 1998 nonfiction book about boyhood and boy culture by clinical psychologist Dr William S. Pollack, in which the author asserts that toxic conceptions of masculinity in boy culture leads to boys doing poorly in education and health and having higher involvement in violent crimes and suicide than girls.

Pollack devoted more than 20 years to researching the material presented in the book.

== Reception ==
Real Boys became a bestseller. A Toronto District School Board review of the book says: "Pollack's groundbreaking book has become the academic bible that the new boys' movement was launched from."

The philosopher Christina Hoff Sommers, who attributes the book's popularity to the public response to the Columbine High School massacre, writes that Real Boys is, "The most popular book calling for the rescue of boys from the constraints of a harmful masculinity".
