= Abraham Solomon Polack =

English-born Australian auctioneer and convicted fraudster (1797–1873)

- Born: 23 August 1797; London, Middlesex, England
- Died: 12 June 1873 (aged 75); Redfern, Sydney, New South Wales, Australia
- Relatives: Joel Samuel Polack (brother); George Barron Goodman (son-in-law)

Abraham Solomon Polack (23 August 1797 (Note: Polack's death notice records him as at the age of 77 at the time of his death, which does not line up with his supposed birth date.)– 12 June 1873) was an English-born Australian auctioneer and convicted fraudster.

== Life and career ==
Polack was born in London on 23 August 1797. In 1820, he arrived in Australia aboard the Agamemnon; he had been sentenced to seven years transportation for stealing a watch. He was assigned to Jacob Josephson. In 1824, he was described as a shopman and clerk. In October of the same year, he was granted a ticket of leave, and the following month, he opened a grocery store. In 1827, Polack was issued with a certificate of freedom.

From 1827 to 1833, Polack held the license of the London Tavern. Subsequently, he became an auctioneer and purchased extensive landholdings. Additionally, he was one of the first subscribers to the Commercial Bank. At one point, he occupied several buildings on George Street, which were later owned by English ship captain William Deloitte. Although Polack's auctioneer career had been described as successful, he soon ran into legal troubles. In 1848, he was declared bankrupt after an employee stole £50,000. Whilst his auctioneer career resumed, in 1854, Polack, and another man, W. D. Wells, were convicted by the Central Criminal Court for conspiring to defraud a man named Cahill. Polack and his accomplice attempted to defraud Cahill in regard to property, which Cahill had entrusted to Polack as his agent. Ultimately, Polack was sentenced to two years imprisonment and a fine of £900, whereas Wells received the same sentence, bar the fine.

In 1859, Polack was committed for trial upon two charges. Firstly, he was charged of obtaining money under false pretences from J. P. Moffit, an attorney. Secondly, he was charged of accusing Moffit, in open court, of swindling a girl out of a gold nugget. In 1861, he was found guilty of swindling W. P. Moffatt of £140, (Note: Most likely the same person as Moffit, given the similarities of the names and amount of money swindled.) and sentenced to three and a half years of hard labour on the roads, which was then reduced to hard labour in Darlinghurst Gaol.

Polack died on 12 June 1873, at his residence on Kent-terrace, Newton Road, Redfern. His death notice recorded him as 77 years old at the time of his death, yet, the Australian Dictionary of Biography records him in the circumstance that he was 75 years old when he died. His funeral was held on 15 June 1873.

== Personal life ==
On 27 September 1824, he married Hannah Brian. He had at least three children, two sons, and a daughter, Sarah Polack. In 1842, when Sarah was 17, she was returning from a trip to England on the Eden, alongside her brothers and mother, when they made the acquaintance of George Barron Goodman. A romance soon developed between Sarah and George, which quickly drew opposition from Abraham Solomon Polack. Polack, who was Jewish, was a staunch supporter of the Sabbath, whereas Goodman operated his photography business on Saturdays.

Sarah and George sought the assistance of Joel Samuel Polack, Abraham's business partner and brother, who could secure a 'special license' for the couple to marry without Abraham's consent. It appears that Abraham relented, given that the couple married under Jewish rights, with the wedding ceremony occurring on 4 January 1843, and a ketubbah drawn up. A dowry was noted, with 100 pieces of silver paid to the groom, which was matched by the groom to form an amount of 200 silver zuzim.
