= Kaim Pollák =

Hungarian writer and educator

- Born: October 6, 1835; Liptó-Szent-Miklós, Kingdom of Hungary
- Died: March 28, 1905 (aged 69); Budapest, Kingdom of Hungary
- Occupations: Writer, educator
- Writing career
- Language: Hungarian, German, Hebrew

Kaim Pollák (Yiddish: חיים בן יעקב פאָללאק, romanized: Ḥayyim ben Yaʿaḳov Polaḳ; October 6, 1835 – March 28, 1905) was a Hungarian writer and educator.

== Biography ==
Pollák was born to a Jewish family in Liptószentmiklós, Hungary, where his father was a spice merchant. He received a Talmudic education in his hometown, and later in Presburg and Sátoraljaújhely. In 1858 he went to Prague, where he attended Rapoport's lectures, and then taught successively at the Jewish schools in Szekszárd, Hódmezővásárhely, and Óbuda (Alt-Ofen). When, in 1870, the Jewish school of the last-named community was made a municipal common school, Pollák was retained in his position, which he continued to hold until his retirement in 1902.

Pollák was a prolific writer, contributing to Ben Chananja, Magyar-Zsidó Szemle, and other Hungarian Jewish journals and yearbooks. He published several textbooks, one of which, a geometry for public schools, passed through eight editions between 1878 and 1905. He also published a complete Hebrew-Hungarian dictionary and translations of various Hebrew works into Hungarian. In 1882 and 1883 Pollák edited the religious journal Jeschurun, directed mainly against the anti-Semitic writings of Rohling.

== Selected publications ==
- A méterrendszerről (in Hungarian). Pest. 1872.
- Természettan népés felsőbb népiskolák számára (in Hungarian). Budapest. 1876. With J. Sümeghy.
- Térés alaktan alkalmas feladványokkal a népiskola IV., V. és VI. osztálya, valamint ismétlő-iskolák számára (in Hungarian). Budapest. 1877.
- Elemi mértan (in Hungarian). Budapest. 1878.
- A rajztanítás kézikönyve (in Hungarian). Leipzig. 1879. Translated from a work of F. V. Tretau.
- Héber-magyar teljes szótár / Naḥalat Yaʿakov (in Hungarian and Hebrew). Vol. 1–7. Budapest: Löwy. 1880. A complete Hebrew-Hungarian dictionary.
- Válogatott gyöngyök (in Hungarian). Budapest: Müller. 1886. A Hungarian translation of Mivḥar ha-Peninim by Ibn Gabirol.
- Megillat Antiochus (in Hungarian and Hebrew). Drohobicz. 1886. A Hungarian translation with Hebrew notes.
- Tikkun middot ha-nefesh. Budapest: A. Alkalay. 1895. By Ibn Gabirol.
- Izrael népének multjából (in Hungarian). Budapest: Eckstein & Neufeld. 1896.
- Petaḥ Teshuvah. Presburg. 1898. By Gabriel Schlossberger.
- Josephinische Aktenstücke über Alt-Ofen (in German). Vienna: M. Waizner & Sohn. 1902.
- Die Erinnerung an die Vorfahren (in German). Vienna. 1902. A history of mourning customs.
- Rabbi Nathans System der Ethik und Moral (in German). Budapest: A. Alkalay & Sohn. 1905. On the Avot of Rabbi Natan.
