= Michal Polák =

Michal Polák, Michel Polak or Michael Polák may refer to:

- Michal Polák (programmer) (a.k.a. Michael Polák), Czech computer programmer and musician, developer of the Arachne web browser
- Michel Polak (1885–1948), Swiss-Belgian architect
- Michal Polák (ice hockey), Czech ice hockey player
- Michal Polák (footballer), Slovak football player with FK Lokomotíva Devínska Nová Ves
- Michal Polak (guitarist), Slovak guitarist, arranger, and music educator
