= Maria Anna Polak =

Polish and Canadian civil engineer

Maria Anna "Marianna" Polak is a Polish and Canadian civil engineer whose research concerns the analysis and testing of structural concrete and concrete structures. She is a professor in the Department of Civil and Environmental Engineering at the University of Waterloo, where she holds a University Research Chair.

== Education and career ==
Polak was a student at Tadeusz Kościuszko Kraków University of Technology, where she received a master's degree in 1982 and a master's degree in 1984. After working as a structural engineer, she came to Canada for a doctorate at the University of Toronto, completed in 1992.

She joined the University of Waterloo faculty in 1992.

== Recognition ==
Polak became a Humboldt Research Fellow in 1998. She was named as a Fellow of the Canadian Society for Civil Engineering in 2020, and elected to the Canadian Academy of Engineering in 2022. She is also a Fellow of the American Concrete Institute.
