= Maria Polack =

English novelist and educator

- Born: 31 January 1787
- Died: 8 January 1849 (aged 61); Whitechapel
- Occupations: Teacher of music and poetry
- Writing career
- Language: English
- Genre: Fiction
- Notable work: Fiction without Romance (1830)

Maria Polack (31 January 1787 – 8 January 1849) was an English Jewish novelist and educator. Her father, Ephraim Polack, was a prominent member of the Great Synagogue of London, and her niece (or perhaps daughter), Elizabeth Polack, was the first Jewish woman melodramatist in England.

In 1830 Polack published by subscription the two-volume anti-romance Fiction without Romance, or The Locket Watch, which focuses on the importance of female education and respecting religious and class differences. The novel depicts a gentile family in Devonshire, a member of whom, Eliza Desbro, encounters a sympathetic Jewish family after discovering her status as a bastard. The one-hundred and twenty subscribers to Polack's book included John Braham (two copies), Mrs Nathan Rothschild (five copies), and members of the Goldsmid family (six copies). A second, non-subscriber edition was published two years after the first edition.

== Bibliography ==
- Polack, Maria (1830). Fiction Without Romance; or The Locket-Watch. London: Effingham Wilson.
- Polack, Maria (1832) Fiction Without Romance; or The Locket-Watch. London: A. K. Newman & Co.
