= Pollock (disambiguation) =

Pollock is an Atlantic fish of the genus Pollachius.

Pollock may also refer to:

- Pollock (surname), a surname (and list of people with the name)
- Jackson Pollock (1912–1956), an American painter

== Places ==
- Pollock, Idaho, U.S.
- Pollock, Louisiana, U.S.
- Pollock, Missouri, U.S.
- Pollock, South Dakota, U.S.
- Pollock Castle, a castle in Scotland
- Pollock Halls of Residence, residence halls at University of Edinburgh, Scotland
- Pollock Halls (Penn State)
- Pollock Pines, California, U.S., a CDP

== Other uses ==
- Pollock (film), a 2000 biography of Jackson Pollock
- Clan Pollock, a Scottish clan
- Pollock baronets, created in Nova Scotia and in the UK
- Pollock Medal, a British military award
- Benjamin Pollock's Toy Shop, in London, England
- Pollock's Toy Museum

== See also ==
- Alaska pollock or walleye pollock, a fish species of the cod family
- Justice Pollock (disambiguation)
- Norway pollock, a rare fish of the cod family
- Polack (disambiguation)
- Pollack (disambiguation)
- Polloc (disambiguation)
- Pollok (disambiguation)
