= Pollack (surname) =

Pollack is a surname. It derives from Polish noun Polak, meaning a Pole. Notable people with the surname include:

- Alan W. Pollack, American musicologist
- Andrea Pollack (1961–2019), East German swimmer
- Andrew Pollack (born 1966), American school safety activist
- Ben Pollack (1903–1971), American drummer and bandleader
- Brittany Pollack, American ballet dancer
- Daniel Pollack, American pianist
- David M. Pollack, (born 1982), American football linebacker
- Egon Pollack (1898–1984), Austrian footballer
- Eileen Pollack (born 1956), American novelist, essayist and writer
- Frank Pollack (born 1967), American Football Coach
- Gadi Pollack, Israeli illustrator
- Golan Pollack (born 1991), Israeli Olympic judoka
- Harold Pollack, American professor at the University of Chicago
- Harvey Pollack (1922–2015), American statistician
- Henry Pollack (born 1961), Cuban-born American radio host
- Henry Pollack, American professor
- Howard Pollack (born 1952), American professor
- James B. Pollack (1938–1994), American astrophysicist
- Junco Sato Pollack, Japanese American contemporary artist
- Kenneth M. Pollack (born 1966), American CIA intelligence analyst
- Keshia Pollack Porter, American injury epidemiologist
- Lew Pollack (1895–1946), American composer
- Lumi Pollack (born 2009), American actress
- Martha Pollack (born 1958), 14th president of Cornell University
- Martin Pollack (1944–2025), Austrian journalist, book author, translator, Slavist and historian
- Maurice Pollack (1885–1968), Canadian merchant and philanthropist
- Michael Pollack (musician), American musician
- Michael Pollack, the birth name of Michael J. Pollard (1939–2019), American actor
- Neal Pollack (born 1970), American satirist, novelist and writer
- Olaf Pollack (born 1973), East German road racing cyclist
- Rachel Pollack (1945–2023), American science fiction author and comic book writer
- Reginald Pollack (1924–2001), American painter
- Richard M. Pollack (1935–2018), American mathematician
- Robert Pollack (disambiguation)
  - Robert Pollack (biologist), American biologist
- Rocky Pollack, Canadian Manitoba judge
- Rozanne Pollack (born 1948), American bridge player
- Stephanie Pollack, American public servant
- Sydney Pollack (1934–2008), American film director, producer and actor
- William Pollack (disambiguation)

== Fictional people named Pollack ==
- Bertie Pollack

== See also ==
- Pollack (disambiguation)
- Pollock (disambiguation)
