= Robin Mallapert =

French musician

Robin Mallapert (fl. 1538–1553) was a French musician of the Renaissance, probably a composer, who spent most of his life in Rome. He is best known as the teacher of Palestrina.

Nothing definite is known about the beginning or end of his life, but he was employed successively by several Roman churches and chapels: the Cappella Liberiana at the Basilica di Santa Maria Maggiore, the San Luigi dei Francesi, the Cappella Giulia (the Julian Chapel) at St Peter's, and Basilica di San Giovanni in Laterano. During the period 1538-1539, when he was maestro di cappella at Santa Maria Maggiore, Palestrina was one of his singers: most likely he taught him singing and/or composition at this time.

No music is assigned to him with certainty. However, a set of six settings of the Magnificat, attributed to "Rubino", are most likely his.
