= Polášek =

Polášek (feminine Polášková) is a Czech surname. Notable people with the surname include:

- Adam Polášek (born 1991), Czech ice hockey player
- Albin Polasek (1879–1965), Czech-American sculptor and educator
- Filip Polášek (born 1985), Slovak professional tennis player
- Libor Polášek (born 1974), Czech retired professional ice hockey player
- Petra Polášková (born 1979), Czech footballer
- Silvie Polášková, Czech handball player
- Tim Polasek
- Viktor Polášek (born 1997), Czech ski jumper

== See also ==
- Polaschek
