= Villotta =

Villotta (pl. villotte) is a type of popular song found mainly in Northern Italy, especially in Friuli.

Often using folk music or folk songs in dialect, the structure of the modern villotta entails four hendecasyllabic lines of verse followed by a refrain. Villotte from the sixteenth-century are typically strophic dialect songs that frequently contain nonsense syllables and passages in triple time.

== Bibliography ==
- Donna G. Cardamone, 'Villotta', Grove Music Online ed. L. Macy. Available at http://www.grovemusic.com/.
- Alfred Einstein, The Italian Madrigal. Translated by Alexander H. Knappe, Roger H. Sessions and Oliver Strunk. 3 vols. Princeton, N.J.: Princeton University Press, 1949.
