= Sergey Timashev =

Serge Fedorovich Timashev (Russian: Сергей Федорович Тимашев, born September 29, 1937, in Irbit, Sverdlovsk Oblast, Soviet Union) is a Russian scientist performing research for USPolyResearch. He is best known for his work in flicker-noise spectroscopy (extraction of information from chaotic signals), physical chemistry (membrane processes), kinetics of chemical processes (diffusion in energy space), quantum physics (semiconductors), and Earth/space science (mechanism of global changes and evolution).

== Biography ==
Timashev holds MS in Physics from the Moscow State University (1960), PhD in nuclear physics from the Institute of Theoretical and Experimental Physics (Moscow, 1966), and DSc in physics and mathematics from the Institute of Semiconductor Physics (Novosibirsk, 1975). His major job track record includes senior researcher (1969 to 1979) at the Institute of Physical Chemistry, USSR Academy of Science, Moscow; head of membrane process laboratory (1979 to present) at the Karpov Institute of Physical Chemistry, Moscow; professor in molecular physics (1990 to 1994) at the Moscow Engineering Physics Institute; professor in physics (1997 to present) at the Peoples' Friendship University of Russia; senior researcher (2005 to present) at USPolyResearch.

== Scientific achievements ==
Timashev developed a flicker-noise spectroscopy method for extracting information from the chaotic signals produced by complex systems, which can be used for analyzing and predicting the behavior of these systems (earthquake prediction, EKG evaluation, Parkinsonian tremor signal evaluation, random electrochemical processes, etc.) He discovered the phenomenon of switching conductivity for surface-modified ion exchange polymeric membranes and electropervaporation effect. He also described the role of chemical and solar factors in the biosphere evolution. The total number of papers and books published by him is more than 300. He currently serves on the Editorial Advisory Boards of Russ. J. Phys. Chem., Russ. J. Electrochem., Colloid J., and J. Water Chem. Technol.

== Honors and awards ==
Timashev received Russian Federation Government's Prize in Science and Technology (1995), Ernest Oppenheimer Memorial Trust (WD Wilson Visiting Fellowship, South Africa, 1996), and Russian Federation's Distinguished Scientist (1998).
