= Abraham Isaac Polack =

Dutch Jewish engraver

Abraham Isaac Polack was a Dutch Jewish engraver who worked in Amsterdam in the 18th century.
