= Joel Samuel Polack =

New Zealand trader and businessman (1807–1882)

- Born: 28 March 1807; London, England
- Died: 17 April 1882 (aged 75); San Francisco, California, United States
- Occupations: Trader, merchant, writer, ethnographer
- Known for: Early New Zealand settler, author of works on Māori culture

Joel Samuel Polack (28 March 1807 – 17 April 1882) was an English-born New Zealand and American businessman and writer. He was one of the first Jewish settlers in New Zealand, arriving in 1831. He is regarded as an authority on pre-colonial New Zealand and his two books are often cited. He was a maternal uncle of Alexander Salmon.

== Early life ==
Joel Samuel Polack was born in London, England on 28 March 1807 to Sarah and Solomon Joel Polack (died 1839). Originally from Holland, the family had settled in Ireland and then England where Soloman was a successful painter and engraver. Polack worked for the War Office (Commissariat and Ordnance) for four years, serving in South Africa and in Mauritius, before leaving to travel in America. In 1830, he joined his brother Abraham Solomon Polack in New South Wales.

== First visit to New Zealand ==
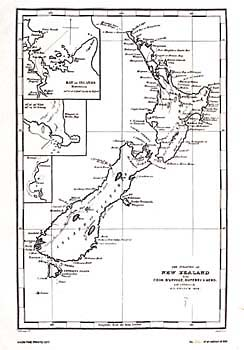
Islands of New Zealand by Joel Samuel Polack

In 1831, he arrived in New Zealand and settled in the Hokianga, exploring the surrounding area as well as Poverty Bay and the East Cape. As such he was one of the first Jews in the colony. In 1832, he moved to Kororāreka (now Russell) in the Bay of Islands, establishing a successful general store. In 1835 he built New Zealand's first brewery, later getting into New Zealand's first duel with the neighbouring innkeeper. Critical of James Busby's weak administration he signed the 1837 petition requesting the British government assume responsibility for the protection and government of European settlers.

== Return to England ==
He returned to England in 1837 and the following year his Kororāreka store, which had been used against his wishes to store military and naval explosives, was destroyed in an explosion. He fought unsuccessfully for years for compensation. In 1838 he appeared before a House of Lords Select Committee advocating planned colonisation of New Zealand. He believed that unorganised European settlement would destroy Māori society. He wrote two successful books based on his experiences in New Zealand, which he also illustrated. These books are an invaluable insight into pre-colonial New Zealand.

== Second visit to New Zealand ==
Polack returned to New Zealand in 1842 but his store was destroyed again in 1845, when Kororāreka was attacked by Hōne Heke—the Battle of Kororāreka commencing the Flagstaff War. He moved to Auckland (the new capital) where he operated a bonded warehouse and branched out into shipping, profiting from trade with California. From 1845 to 1848, he was the vice consul for the United States of America.

== Later life ==
In 1850 Polack left New Zealand for California. He settled in San Francisco, where he married Mary, the widow of William Hart (who had both lived in New Zealand). He died on 17 April 1882 (28 Nisan 5642) in San Francisco and was buried in the Laurel Hill cemetery. In 1946 his remains were moved to the Cypress Lawn Memorial Park.

== Writings ==
- New Zealand; Being a Narrative of Travels and Adventures during a Residence in that Country between the Years 1831 and 1837 (1838). Full text Vol. I, Vol. II
- Manners and Customs of the New Zealanders (1840). Full text Vol. I, Vol. II

== See also ==
- History of the Jews in New Zealand
