= William W. Stewart =

Scottish sealer and whaler

William W. Stewart (c. 1776 – 10 September 1851) was a Scottish sealer and whaler after whom New Zealand's Stewart Island is named.

Stewart served in the Royal Navy from 1793 to 1797. In June 1801 he arrived in Port Jackson (Sydney), New South Wales, and used £1500 to purchase a partnership in a Bass Strait sealing business with John Palmer. In 1809 he was first officer on the Pegasus which sailed to New Zealand, where he corrected two of James Cook's errors in his map of the New Zealand coast, establishing the insularity of Stewart Island and confirming that Banks Peninsula was not an island.

In 1826 Stewart was instrumental in the establishment of a timber, flax and trading settlement at Port Pegasus, the first European settlement on Stewart Island. Although the settlement failed within a year Stewart himself returned in 1840 to settle on the island.

William W. Stewart is sometimes confused with the John Stewart who in 1831 was involved in a massacre of more than 150 Māori at Akaroa and Port Levy.

He died in Poverty Bay on 10 September 1851.
