= Jakub Polak (musician) =

Polish musician

Jakub Polak (c. 1545 - c. 1605), also known as Jakub Reys (Reis, de Rais, de Reiz, de Restz, de Retz, du Retz) and Jacques le Polonois, was a Polish lutenist and composer. He was notable for his service as court lutenist to Henry III of Poland and France. Initially Polak served as one of the court musicians at Kraków, and after Henry III fled Poland, Polak joined him in Paris in 1574. He was an author of several lute compositions, most notably preludies, fantasies, dances and several chansons. During his lifetime he was renowned for his lute improvisations.
