= Pollack =

Pollack may refer to:

- Pollack (surname), a surname (and list of people with the name)
- Pollack (fish) or pollock
- Pollack (card game), a German card game resembling Tresette
- Pollack (Martian crater)
- Sei whale or pollack whale

== See also ==
- Polack (disambiguation)
- Pollack's rule, a rule about microprocessor performance
- Pollock (disambiguation)
