= Jakub Polák (anarchist) =

Czech human rights activist

Jakub Polák (1 September 1952 – 25 September 2012) was a Czech anarchist and anti-racism activist. Polák was involved particularly in Roma rights and squatters' rights issues.

== Early life ==
Polák was born in Karlovy Vary and grew up in Marxist–Leninist Czechoslovakia. He became a dissident in his teens, when he became involved in the Prague Spring of 1968, and as a consequence he was not permitted to attend university. He took part in various dissident and underground movement activities. He was a co-founder of the 1989 strike committee that led to the Velvet Revolution. He was also involved with the Czech branch of the Movement for Civil Society.

== Activism ==
After the fall of the Eastern Bloc, Polák openly founded numerous anarchist organizations and publications. He joined the "Levá alternativa" ("LA"; transl. "Left Alternative"), eventually becoming a member of its anarchist wing. The group split, with the anarchist LA becoming the Československé anarchistické sdružení (ČAS; transl. Czechoslovak Anarchist Association). In 1991, Polák and others from ČAS founded the A-Kontra magazine, which became the central organ of the Czech anarchist movement in the 1990s and early 2000s. Polák remained involved with A-Kontra until his death, working as editor-in-chief with the magazine.

Polák was involved in numerous anti-racist organizations and activities. He worked as "attorney-in-fact" with numerous victims of racist and neo-Nazi attacks, including in the case of Tibor Danihel, a victim of a 1993 attack by racist skinheads in Písek, South Bohemia, which he eventually brought to the Czech Supreme Court. Polák was also instrumental in the cases of the 1994 murder of Zdeněk Čepela in Tanvald; the 1998 murder of Milan Lacek in Orlová; a 1998 racist skinhead campaign in České Budějovice; the 2001 murder of Ota Absolon in Svitavy; and a 2010 attack by neo-Nazis in Benešov. He also served as an editor of various Romani publications, including the Romano gendalos (transl. "Romani Mirror") between 1993 and 1995, and with a news server Romea.cz until the end of his life. Polák was himself attacked in August, 1999, in a restaurant in Karvina, where he was meeting government minister Jana Chalupova regarding a 1998 skinhead murder of a Romani.

Polák was active in housing and squatters rights movements throughout his life. In 1990, he co-founded a squat on Pplk. Sochora street in Prague. He remained active in squatters' rights movements throughout the rest of his life. Even in the last months of his life, while ill with cancer, Polák worked with Roma people in a case involving their eviction and relocation from their home in Přednádraží, a neighborhood (sometimes described as a ghetto or shantytown) in Ostrava-Privoz.

== Death ==
Jakub Polák died on Tuesday 25 September 2012, from cancer.

== Awards ==
- 2000 – František Kriegel Award from the Charter 77 Foundation (Nadace Charty 77), for anti-racist work
