= Pollock (surname) =

Pollock is a surname. In some cases, it originates as a locative name derived from Upper Pollock, Renfrewshire, Scotland. An early bearer of a form of this surname is Peter de Pollok, in about 1172–1178. In other cases, the surname is derived from the Middle English personal name *Pollok (Old English *Pulloc). An early bearer of a form of this surname is Roger Pollok, in 1332.

== Notable people surnamed Pollock ==
- A. J. Pollock (born 1987), American baseball player
- Adelaide Lowry Pollock (1860–1938), American school educator and bird conservationist
- Alan Pollock (born 1962), English playwright and scriptwriter
- Alexander Pollock, Canadian actor
- Alexander Pollock (politician) (born 1944), Scottish parliamentarian
- Algernon J. Pollock (1864–1957), Evangelist and writer from the Plymouth Brethren movement
- Allyson Pollock, Scottish professor of public health policy
- Andrew Pollock (disambiguation)
  - Andrew Maclean Pollock (1914–1969), Scottish-born South African cricketer
  - Andrew Graeme Pollock (born 1969), South African cricketer, son of Andrew Maclean Pollock
- Bertram Pollock (1863–1943), Anglican bishop
- Brice Pollock (born 2005), American football player
- Carl Arthur Pollock (1903–1978), Canadian businessman
- Channing Pollock (disambiguation)
- Charles Edward Pollock (1823–1897), English judge
- Craig Pollock (born 1956), British F1 manager and businessman
- Daniel Pollock (1969–1992), Australian actor
- Daniel C. Pollock (1913–2007), United States Marine Corps colonel and Navy Cross recipient
- David Pollock (disambiguation)
  - David Pollock (judge) (1780–1847), British judge in India
  - David Pollock (actor) (born 1961), American former child actor
  - David Pollock (rugby union) (born 1987), rugby union player for Ulster Rugby
  - David Pollock, 3rd Viscount Hanworth (born 1946), British peer, academic and Labour member of the House of Lords
  - David Pollock (humanist) (1942–2023), British secular humanist
  - Dave Pollock (born 1942), Australian politician
  - David C. Pollock (1939–2004), American sociologist
- Dee Pollock (1937–2005), American film and television actor
- Duncan Pollock (1929–2006), Ulster unionist
- Eddie Pollock (born 1957), Scottish cricketer
- Edward Pollock (1823–1858), American poet
- Edwin A. Pollock (1899–1982), United States Marine Corps general and Navy Cross recipient
- Sir Edward James Pollock (1841–1930), British barrister and Official Referee of Supreme Court of Judicature
- Edwin Taylor Pollock (1870–1943), Captain, USN
- Eileen Pollock (1947–2020), Northern Irish actress
- Eileen "Mike" Pollock, American screenwriter
- Eliza Pollock (1840–1919), American archer
- Emma Pollock, Scottish Musician
- Ernest Pollock, 1st Viscount Hanworth (1861–1936), English Attorney General
- Fergus Pollock, British automobile designer
- Finlay Pollock (born 2004), Scottish footballer
- Francis Pollock (1876–1957), Canadian science fiction writer
- Sir Frederick Pollock, 1st Baronet (1783–1870), British lawyer and politician
- Sir Frederick Pollock, 3rd Baronet (1845–1937), British jurist
- F. H. Pollock (Frederick Hart Pollock; 1842–1908), actor and theatrical manager in Australia
- Friedrich Pollock (1894–1970), German philosopher and economist
- Gale Pollock, acting U.S. Army Deputy Surgeon General
- George Pollock (1786–1872), British field marshal
- George Pollock (Australian politician) (1890–1939), speaker of the Legislative Assembly of Queensland
- George Pollock (director) (1907–1979), English film director
- George David Pollock (1817–1897), British surgeon
- George Frederick Pollock (1821–1915), British lawyer
- Graeme Pollock (born 1944), South African cricketer
- Griselda Pollock (born 1949), British art historian
- Harry Frederick Pollock (1857–1901), British lawyer and politician
- Henry Pollock (1864–1953), Hong Kong politician and barrister
- Henry W. Pollock (1878–1954), New York state senator
- Howard Wallace Pollock (1920–2011), American politician
- Hugh Alexander Pollock (1888–1971), British editor, soldier and husband of Enid Blyton and Ida Pollock
- Hugh MacDowell Pollock (1852–1937), Northern Ireland Minister of Finance
- Ida Pollock (1908–2013), British romance novelist and centenarian; wife of Hugh Pollock
- Sir J. Donald Pollock (1868–1962), Scottish industrialist and Rector of Edinburgh University
- Jackson Pollock (1912–1956), American artist
- Jame Pollock (born 1979), Canadian ice hockey player
- James Pollock (American politician) (1810–1890), Governor of Pennsylvania
- James Dalgleish Pollock VC (1890–1958), British soldier
- Jamie Pollock (born 1974), English footballer
- Jamie Pollock (soccer, born 1989), American soccer player
- Jean-Yves Pollock, French linguist and professor
- Jim Pollock (1930–2021), Canadian politician
- John L. Pollock (1940–2009), American philosopher
- Kevin Pollock (born 1970), Canadian referee in the National Hockey League
- Lloyd Pollock (1909–1993), president of the Canadian Amateur Hockey Association
- Mark Pollock, blind Northern Irish adventurer
- Mary Pollock, pseudonym used by Enid Blyton
- Michael Pollock (Royal Navy officer), British Admiral of the Fleet and First Sea Lord
- Michael Pollock (tenor) (1921–2003), American operatic tenor, opera director, and voice teacher
- Mike Pollock (voice actor) (born 1965), American actor
- Mike Pollock (rugby league), New Zealand rugby league footballer who played in the 1910s and 1920s
- Oliver Pollock (1737–1823), American Revolutionary and financier
- Paul Pollock (born 1986), Irish marathon runner and medical doctor
- Peter Pollock (born 1941), South African cricketer
- Robert Pollock (disambiguation)
  - Robert Pollock (actor) (born 1960), New Zealand actor
  - Robert L. Pollock, business writer for The Wall Street Journal
  - Robert M. Pollock (1856–1920), Republican member of the North Dakota House of Representatives
  - Robert Mason Pollock (1926–2012), American television writer
  - Robert A. Pollock (1930–2003), footballer turned writer-novelist who wrote the novel Loophole
  - Robert Pollok (poet) (1798–1827), Scottish poet best known for The Course of Time
  - Robert Pollok (British Army officer) (1884–1979), Irish-born British Army officer
- Sam Pollock (1925–2007), Canadian hockey manager
- Sharon Pollock (1936–2021), Canadian playwright
- Shaun Pollock (born 1973), South African cricketer
- Sheldon Pollock, American Sanskritist
- Wellesca Pollock (1871–1940), American educator
- William H. K. Pollock (1859–1896), English chess player
- Sir William Frederick Pollock, 2nd Baronet (1815–1888), British lawyer
- William P. Pollock (1870–1922), Senator from South Carolina

== Fictional people named Pollock ==
- Bertie Pollock

== See also ==
- Clan Pollock, Scottish clan
- Pollock baronets
- Pollack (surname)
- Pollock (disambiguation)
