= Clan Pollock =

Scottish clan

Pollock
- Crest: A boar passant shot through with a dart Proper
- Motto: Audacter et Strenue (Boldly and strongly)

Profile
- Region: Lowlands
- District: Renfrewshire
- Founder: Fulbert de Pulloc
- Pollock no longer has a chief, and is an armigerous clan
- Historic seat: Pollok Castle
- Last Chief: Sir Robert Pollok, 2nd Baronet (died 1783)
Septs of Pollock
Pogue, Polk, Pollok, Pollack, Polloke, Pollick, Polloch, Pook, Pooke, Poock, Polke, Paulk, Poalk, Poalke, Poulk, Poole, Pogue, Poag, Poage, Poague, Poak
Allied clans
Clan Maxwell
Rival clans
Clan Johnstone
Titles
Pollock Baronets

Clan Pollock is an armigerous Scottish clan whose origin lies in a grant of land on the southern bank of the River Clyde, courtesy of King David I, to the sons of Fulbert from Walter fitz Alan, the 1st High Steward of Scotland, in the 12th century. It is among the oldest recorded surnames in Scotland. The clan is a sept of Clan Maxwell.

== History ==
=== Origins of the clan ===
The clan can trace its origin to Fulbert, a vassal knight of Walter fitz Alan from Oswestry, Shropshire, England. Fulbert came to Scotland with Walter fitz Alan in about 1136 and fought for Scotland at the Battle of the Standard at Northallerton in 1138. Fulbert's sons were granted land in Renfrewshire for the service of their father, a knight to Walter fitz Alan, reconfirmed in a charter in 1157 by Malcolm IV. The family name is retained in placenames such as Pollok, Pollokshields and Pollokshaws, all situated to the south side of the River Clyde, between Glasgow city centre and Paisley.

The church of Pollock was given to the monks of the Priory of Paisley in 1163 by Petrus de Polloc, eldest son of Fulbert. As part of a dowry for one of his daughters, Petrus bestowed the barony of Rothes upon her. Robert de Polloc, Fulbert's third son, gave the church of Mearns to the Priory of Paisley. John de Polloc was a signatory to the Ragman Rolls subscribing allegiance to King Edward I of England in 1296. John Pollok of Pollok fought on the side of Mary, Queen of Scots, at the Battle of Langside on 13 May 1568, only a few miles from Pollok Castle and, as a result, was forfeited of some of his lands. John Pollok, his son, was killed on 7 December 1593 at the Battle of Dryfe Sands near Lockerbie during a battle between Clan Maxwell and the Clan Johnstone. Robert Pollok of Pollok was knighted and made 1st Baronet of Pollock by Queen Anne in 1703 for his services to the crown.

=== Genetic history ===
The Polk-Pollock-Pogue DNA Project commenced in 2009 and now has some 400 participants. The project website is maintained at FTDNA and can be accessed there. According to the Polk-Pollock-Pogue DNA Project website the original Pollock family male line's Y chromosome is haplogroup I-M223. Stating "Based on paper trail family research and on its larger diversity it is clear that the I-M223 branch is the one that actually traces back to the original family of Renfrewshire. Among the persons belonging to this group are the descendants of Robert Polke (c.1638-1703), the immigrant from Ireland to the eastern shore of Maryland." Some notable descendants of Robert Polke include Trusten Polk the 12th Governor of Missouri and Charles Polk the 27th and 30th Governor of Delaware.

Notable Descendants

Some notable descendants include Thomas Pollock (1654–1722), colonial governor of North Carolina, Sir Robert Pollock (1665–1735), 1st Baronet, Alexander Hamilton (1775–1804), a founding father of the United States, Oliver Pollock (1737–1823), merchant and inventor of the ($) dollar sign, James Pollock (1810–1890), governor of Pennsylvania, Trusten Polk (1811–1876), 12th governor of Missouri and Charles Polk (1788–1857), 27th and 30th governor of Delaware.

== Clan profile ==
- Clan chief: Clan Pollock has no chief, and is an armigerous clan.
- Chiefly arms: Vert, a saltire, Or, between three hunting horns, in the flanks and in base, Argent, garnished, Gules.
- Motto: Audacter et strenue. The motto translates from Latin as "boldly and earnestly".
- Crest: A boar, shot through with an arrow proper.
- Tartan: Pollock Ancient and Pollock Modern.

== Castles ==
- Pollock Castle

== Peerage ==
- Barony of Rothes (12th century)
- Baronets of Pollock

== See also ==
- Scottish clan
- Clan Maxwell
