= Charles Pogue =

Charles Pogue may refer to:

- Charles Nelson Pogue (1897–1985), Canadian mechanic and inventor
- Charles Edward Pogue (born 1950), American screenwriter, playwright and stage actor
