= David Pollock, 2nd Viscount Hanworth =

The Right Honourable The Viscount Hanworth

Member of the House of Lords
- Lord Temporal
- In office 17 November 1937 – 31 August 1996
- Preceded by: The 1st Viscount Hanworth
- Succeeded by: The 3rd Viscount Hanworth

Personal details
- Born: David Bertram Pollock; 1 August 1916
- Died: 31 August 1996 (aged 80)
- Party: Crossbencher
- Spouse: Isolda Rosamond Parker
- Children: 3
- Other titles: 2nd Baron Hanworth; 2nd Baronet

David Bertram Pollock, 2nd Viscount Hanworth (1 August 1916 – 31 August 1996), was a British engineer, soldier, barrister, and peer, a member of the House of Lords from 1937 until his death.

Hanworth was the son of Charles Thomas Anderson Pollock, an officer killed in action in 1918, and his wife Alice Joyce Becher. His father was the only son of Ernest Pollock, 1st Viscount Hanworth. He was educated at the Royal Military Academy, Woolwich, and commissioned into the Royal Engineers, in which he rose to the rank of Lieutenant-Colonel.

In 1936, he succeeded his grandfather as the second Viscount Hanworth, only months after the viscountcy had been created, but was then too young to take his seat in the Lords. He took his seat on 17 November 1937.

In 1958, Hanworth was called to the bar from the Inner Temple. He was a Chartered Engineer, Fellow of the Institution of Engineering and Technology, and a Fellow of the Royal Photographic Society and the Chartered Quality Institute, and a member of the Institution of Mechanical Engineers.

In 1940, Hanworth married Isolda Rosamond Parker (1918–2014), one of the daughters of Geoffrey Parker, of Cairo. They had two sons, including David Stephen Geoffrey Pollock (born 1946), and one daughter, the Hon. Gillian Isolda Josephine Pollock (born 1944).

He died in 1996 and was succeeded by his elder son.

Peerage of the United Kingdom
Preceded by Ernest Pollock	Viscount Hanworth; 1936–1996; Member of the House of Lords (1937–1996)	Succeeded by David Pollock
Preceded by Ernest Pollock	Baron Hanworth; 1936–1996	Succeeded by David Pollock
Baronetage of the United Kingdom
Preceded by Ernest Pollock	Pollock baronets of Hanworth; 1936–1996	Succeeded by David Pollock
