= Walter Herries Pollock =

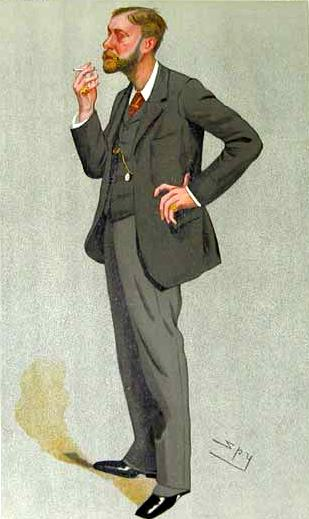
- Caricature by "Spy"
- Born: 21 February 1850; London, England
- Died: 21 February 1926 (aged 76)
- Occupations: Writer, lecturer, poet, journalist
- Spouse: Emma Jane Pipon (m. 1876; died 1922)
- Children: Guy Cameron Pollock
- Writing career
- Genres: Fiction, poetry, non-fiction, essay, literary criticism

Walter Herries Pollock (21 February 1850 – 21 February 1926) was an English writer, poet, lecturer and journalist. He is best known as editor of the Saturday Review, a position he held from 1884 to 1894, but also had published various miscellaneous writings that included novels, short stories, plays, poetry and translated works between 1877 and 1920. He was also, at one time, considered one of the best amateur fencers in Great Britain.

Pollock was well known in Britain's literary circles during the Victorian era and was close friends with a number of writers, including Robert Louis Stevenson, Rudyard Kipling, Oscar Wilde, Egerton Castle, W. E. Henley and Henry Irving. He was also involved in collaborations with Alexander Duffield, Sir Walter Besant, Andrew Lang, F. C. Grove and Camille Prévost and Lilian Moubrey.

A member of the esteemed Pollock family, he was the second son of Sir William Frederick Pollock, 2nd Baronet and brother to lawyer Sir Frederick Pollock, 3rd Baronet and George Frederick Pollock. He in turn was the father of newspaperman Guy Cameron Pollock, a longtime journalist for the Evening Standard and Daily Express, and managing editor of the Morning Post. Walter and Guy Pollock wrote a novel together in 1905.

== Biography ==
Walter Pollock was born in London on 21 February 1850, the second son of Sir William Frederick Pollock, 2nd Baronet. His great-grandfather, Mr. David Pollock, was a member of the British royal court and saddler to King George III. His grandfather was Sir Frederick Pollock, 1st Baronet, Lord Chief Baron of the Exchequer, a high judicial appointment of which he was the penultimate holder. One of his grand-uncles, Sir David Pollock, was the chief justice of Bombay, while another, Sir George Pollock, became a field marshal. His own father was an author and Queen's Remembrancer under Queen Victoria from 1874 to 1886, when the post was passed on to his brother George Frederick Pollock who continued to hold the title until the turn of the 20th century. His eldest brother, Sir Frederick Pollock, 3rd Baronet, was a noted lawyer and frequently worked with him during his career.

Educated at Eton and Trinity College, Cambridge, he graduated with a classical degree in 1871 and was called to the bar at the Inner Temple three years later. He developed an interest in literature and history and began lecturing at the Royal Institution, London. Among the subjects he discussed included the works of Richelieu, Colbert, Victor Hugo, Sir Francis Drake and Théophile Gautier. In 1875, he joined the staff of the Saturday Review and became an assistant editor. It was around this time that he began courting Emma Jane Pipon, daughter of Colonel James Kennard Pipon (1807–1868), Seigneur de Noirmont on Jersey, and the two were married in Chester on 11 January 1876. Their first and only son, Guy Cameron Pollock, was born that same year.

It was while working for the publication that he first began writing professionally and co-wrote Masston: A Story of these Modern Days with Alexander J. Duffield in 1877. He also published literary critical works such as The Modern French Theatre (1878) and Lectures on French Poets (1879), English-language translations of works by Alfred de Musset and Denis Diderot, and collections of poetic verses entitled Songs and Rhymes: English and French (1882) and Verses of Two Tongues (1884).

In 1884, Pollock succeeded Philip Harwood as editor of the Saturday Review and remained with the publication for the next 10 years. He became close friends with many members of Victorian Britain's literary circle including Robert Louis Stevenson, Rudyard Kipling, Oscar Wilde, Egerton Castle, W. E. Henley and Henry Irving. It is also alleged that he had an extramarital affair with English hostess Violet Hunt.

Another close friend and collaborator, Andrew Lang, worked with Pollock on the Saturday Review and published many of Lang's anonymous reviews and "middle" articles. Pollock continued writing, mostly fiction and poetry, and co-authored Uncle Jack (1885) with Sir Walter Besant and He (1887) with Andrew Lang. By himself, he wrote A Nine Men's Morrice (1889), Old and New (1890), The Seal of Fate (1891) and King Zub, and Other Stories (1893). In addition, Pollock contributed 26 poems of "magazine verse" to Longman's from 1890 to 1905. He and Besant also wrote The Ballad-Monger, a stage adaptation of Théodore Faullain de Banville's Gringoire, which was produced by Herbert Beerbohm Tree at the Haymarket Theatre.

In 1894, Pollock left the Saturday Review and went to live at Chawton in Hampshire to devote himself to writing full-time. He wrote novels on German student life, at least one book in French, Monsieur le Marquis de -- (1780–1793), Memoires Inédits Recueillis (1894), various plays, and also made several excursions into belles-lettres. A second collaboration with Sir Walter Besant produced The Charm and Other Drawing-Room Plays (1896). The next year, he co-wrote Fencing (1897) as part of the Badminton series with F. C. Grove and Camille Prévost (Pollock then being considered the finest amateur fencer in Britain) as well as King and Artist: A Romantic Play in Five Acts (1897) with Lilian Moubrey.

Two years later, he wrote Jane Austen: Her Contemporaries and Herself (1899), considered one of the most important works of literary criticism on the female author, and published a revised edition of Watts Phillips' The Dead Heart: A Story of the French Revolution (1900). He and his son Guy Cameron Pollock wrote a novel together, Hay Fever (1905), and wrote biographies of two of his friends titled Impressions of Henry Irving (1908) and The Art of the Hon. John Collier (1914). His final book was Icarian Flights (1920). His wife died in 1922; afterwards she was said to have been the inspiration for his poetry. Pollock lived in retirement until his own death on 21 February 1926.

== Fencing ==
Together with his elder brother Sir Frederick, he participated in the first English revival of historical fencing, originated by Alfred Hutton and his colleagues Egerton Castle, Captain Carl Thimm, Colonel Cyril Matthey, Captain Percy Rolt, Captain Ernest George Stenson Cooke, Captain Frank Herbert Whittow.

== Bibliography ==
- Masston: A Story of these Modern Days (1877, 2 vols., co-written with Alexander J. Duffield)
- The Modern French Theatre (1878)
- Lectures on French Poets (1879)
- Amateur Theatricals (1879, co-written with his mother, Lady (Juliet) Pollock; illustrations by Kate Greenaway)
- The Poet and the Muse (1880, a version of Alfred de Musset's "La nuit de mai," "La nuit d'août," and "La nuit d'octobre."
- Songs and Rhymes: English and French (1882, includes "The Devout Lover", "Chansonette" and "Chaque jour, dès l'aurore" set to music c1883 by Maude Valérie White)
- The Picture's Secret and An Episode in the Life of Mr. Latimer (1883)
- The Paradox of Acting (1883, translation of Paradoxe sur le comédien by Denis Diderot, preface by Henry Irving)
- Verses of Two Tongues (1884)
- On ne badine pas avec l'amour ; and Fantasio (1884, two comedies by Alfred de Musset, edited with an Introduction and notes by Pollock; with an essay "The Progress of French Comedy", by George Saintsbury)
- Sir Jocelyn's Cap (1885, co-written with Sir Walter Besant, included in Besant's collection Uncle Jack, etc.)
- The Action to the Word, in the collection The Broken Shaft: Tales in Mid-Ocean by various authors, edited by Henry Norman)
- He (1887, a gentle satire on She by H. Rider Haggard, co-written with Andrew Lang)
- A Nine Men's Morrice (1889, short stories, includes Edged Tools, co-written with Brander Matthews)
- Fencing (1889, co-written with F. C. Grove and Camille Prévost)
- Old and New (1890)
- The Seal of Fate (1891, co-written with his mother, Lady (Juliet) Pollock}
- With My Friends (1891, two tales in a collection by various authors, all co-written with Brander Matthews)
- King Zub, and Other Stories (1893)
- Monsieur le Marquis de -- (1780–1793), Memoires Inédits Recueillis (1894)
- The Charm, and Other Drawing-Room Plays (1896, co-written with Walter Besant)
- King and Artist: A Romantic Play in Five Acts (1897, co-written with Lilian Moubrey)
- The Were-Wolf: A Romantic Play in One Act (1898, co-written with Lilian Moubrey)
- Jane Austen, her Contemporaries and Herself (1899)
- The Dead Heart: A Story of the French Revolution (1889, a revised version by Pollock of the 1859 play The Dead Heart by Watts Phillips, for a revival by Henry Irving)
- A Sextet of Singers (1900?, five poems in a collection by six authors)
- Animals That Have Owned Us (1904)
- Hay Fever (1905, co-written with his son Guy C. Pollock)
- Sealed Orders and Other Poems (1907) (Note: The title-poem is in memory of his brother-in-law, Captain John Pakenham Pipon, RN, CMG, CB. Some of the twenty-two poems printed in this volume first appeared in Longman's Magazine under the auspices of Andrew Lang (out of a total of 26). Others were first printed in the St James' Gazette, to which Lang also contributed.)
- Impressions of Henry Irving (1908)
- The Art of the Hon. John Collier (1914, published by The Art Annual. Essay on John Collier, 1850–1934, with colour plates)
- Icarian Flights (1920, translations of Horace, with Francis Coutts)
