= Fuel saving device =

Product sold in the automotive aftermarket

Fuel-saving devices are sold on the aftermarket with claims they may improve the fuel economy, the exhaust emissions, or optimize ignition, air flow, or fuel flow of automobiles in some way. An early example of such a device sold with difficult-to-justify claims is the 200 mpg_{‑US} (1.2 L/100 km) carburetor designed by Canadian inventor Charles Nelson Pogue.

The US EPA is required by Section 511 of the Motor Vehicle Information and Cost Savings Act to test many of these devices and to provide public reports on their efficacy; the agency finds most devices do not improve fuel economy to any measurable degree, unlike forced induction, water injection (engine), intercooling and other fuel economy devices which have been long proven. Tests by Popular Mechanics magazine also found unproven types of devices yield no measurable improvements in fuel consumption or power, and in some cases actually decrease both power and fuel economy.

Other organizations generally considered reputable, such as the American Automobile Association and Consumer Reports have performed studies with the same result.

One reason that ineffective fuel-saving gadgets are popular is the difficulty of accurately measuring small changes in the fuel economy of a vehicle. This is because of the high level of variance in the fuel consumption of a vehicle under normal driving conditions. Due to selective perception and confirmation bias, the buyer of a device can perceive an improvement where none actually exists. Also, observer-expectancy effect can result in a user subconsciously altering driving habits. These biases can be either positive or negative to the device tested, depending on the biases of the individual. For these reasons, regulatory bodies have developed standardized drive cycles for consistent, accurate testing of vehicle fuel consumption. Where fuel economy does improve after the fitment of a device, it is usually due to the tune-up procedure that is conducted as part of the installation. In older systems with distributor ignitions, device manufacturers would specify timing advance beyond that recommended by the manufacturer, which by itself could boost fuel economy while potentially increasing emissions of some combustion products, at the risk of possible engine damage.

== Types of devices ==
=== Accessory drive modifications ===
Modifying the accessory drive system can increase fuel economy and performance to some extent. Underdrive pulleys modify the amount of engine power that can be drawn by accessory devices. Such alterations to the drive systems for alternators or air conditioning compressors (rather than the power steering pump, for example) can be detrimental to vehicle usability (e.g., by not keeping the battery fully charged), but will not impair safety.

=== Fuel & oil additives ===
Compounds sold for addition to the vehicle's fuel may include tin, magnesium and platinum. The claimed purpose of these is generally to improve the energy density of the fuel. Additives for addition to the engine oil, sometimes marketed as "engine treatments", contain teflon, zinc, or chlorine compounds.

=== Magnets ===
Magnets attached to a vehicle's fuel line have been claimed to improve fuel economy by aligning fuel molecules, but because motor fuels are non-polar, no such alignment or other magnetic effect on the fuel is possible. When tested, typical magnet devices have shown no effect on vehicle performance or economy.

=== Vapor devices ===
Some devices claim to improve efficiency by changing the way that liquid fuel is converted to vapor. These include fuel heaters and devices to increase or decrease turbulence in the intake manifold. These do not work on standard vehicles because the principle is already applied to the design of the engine. This method is however integral to making vegetable oil conversions, and similar heavy oil engines, run at all.

=== Air bleed devices ===
Devices have been marketed which bleed a small amount of air into the fuel line before the carburetor. These may improve fuel economy because the engine runs slightly lean as a consequence. However, running leaner than the manufacturer intended can cause overheating, piston damage, loss of maximum power and poor emissions (e.g., higher NOx due to higher combustion temperatures, or, if misfiring occurs, greater hydrocarbon emissions).

=== Electronic devices ===
Some electronic devices are marketed as fuel savers. The Fuel Doctor FD-47, for example, plugs into the vehicle's cigarette lighter and displays several LEDs. It is claimed to increase vehicle fuel economy by up to 25% through "power conditioning of the vehicle's electrical systems", but Consumer Reports detected no difference in economy or power in tests on ten separate vehicles, finding that the device did nothing but light up. Car and Driver magazine found that the device contains nothing but "a simple circuit board for the LED lights", and disassembly and circuit analysis reached the same conclusion. The maker disputed claims that the device has no effect, and proposed changes to the Consumer Reports testing procedure, which when implemented made no difference to the results.

Another device described as 'electronic' is the 'Electronic Engine Ionizer Fuel Saver'. Testing of this device resulted in a loss of power and an engine compartment fire.

There are also 'emissions-control defeat devices' that operate by allowing a vehicle's engine to operate outside government-imposed tailpipe emissions parameters. These government standards may force factory engines to operate outside their most efficient range of operation. Either engine control units are reprogrammed to operate more efficiently, or sensors that influence the ECU's operation are modified or 'simulated' to cause it to operate in a more efficient manner. Oxygen sensor simulators allow fuel-economy reducing catalytic converters to be removed. Such devices are often sold for "off-road use only".

== Thermodynamic efficiency ==
The reason why most devices are not capable of producing the claimed improvements is based in thermodynamics. This formula expresses the theoretical efficiency of a petrol engine:

$$\eta = 1 - {1 \over r_v ^{\gamma-1}}$$

where η is efficiency, r_{v} is the compression ratio, and γ is the ratio of the specific heats of the cylinder gases.

Assuming an ideal engine with no friction, perfect insulation, perfect combustion, a compression ratio of 10:1, and a 'γ' of 1.27 (for gasoline-air combustion), the theoretical efficiency of the engine would be 46%.

For example, if an automobile typically gets 20 miles per US gallon (12 L/100 km) with a 20% efficient engine that has a 10:1 compression ratio, a carburetor claiming 100 mpg_{‑US} (2.4 L/100 km) would have to increase the efficiency by a factor of 5, to 100%. This is clearly beyond what is theoretically or practically possible. A similar claim of 300 mpg_{‑US} (0.78 L/100 km) for any vehicle would require an engine (in this particular case) that is 300% efficient, which violates the first law of thermodynamics.

Extremely efficient vehicle designs capable of achieving 100+ mpg_{‑US} (2.4 L/100 km) (such as the VW 1L) do not have substantially greater engine efficiency, but instead focus on better aerodynamics, reduced vehicle weight, and using energy that would otherwise be dissipated as heat during braking.

== Urban legend ==
There is a debunked urban legend about an inventor who creates a 100 mpg_{‑US} (2.4 L/100 km) or even 200 mpg_{‑US} (1.2 L/100 km) carburetor, but after demonstrating it for the major vehicle manufacturers, the inventor mysteriously disappears. In some versions of the story, he is claimed to have been killed by the government. This fiction is thought to have started after Canadian Charles Nelson Pogue filed patents in the 1930s for such a device.

=== MythBusters ===
The popular U.S. television show MythBusters investigated several fuel-saving devices using gasoline- and diesel-powered fuel-injected cars under controlled circumstances. Fuel line magnets, which supposedly align the fuel molecules so they burn better, were tested and found to make no difference in fuel consumption. The debunked notion that adding acetone to gasoline improves efficiency by making the gasoline burn more completely without damaging the plastic parts of the fuel system was tested, and although there was no apparent damage to the fuel system, the vehicle's fuel economy was actually worsened.

The show tested the hypothesis that a car with a carburetor type gasoline engine can run on hydrogen gas alone, which was confirmed as viable, although the high cost of hydrogen gas as well as storage difficulties currently prohibit widespread adoption. They also tested a device that supposedly produces sufficient hydrogen to power a car by electrolysis (running an electric current through water to split its molecules into hydrogen and oxygen). Although some hydrogen was produced, the amount was minuscule compared to the quantity necessary to run a car for even a few seconds.

The show also tested a carburetor that, according to its manufacturer, could improve fuel efficiency to 300 miles per US gallon (0.78 L/100 km). However, the device actually made the car less fuel efficient. They also determined that a diesel-powered car can run on used cooking oil though they did not check whether it damaged the engine.

The show noted that out of 104 fuel efficiency devices tested by the EPA, only seven showed any improvement in efficiency, and even then, the improvement was never more than six percent. The show also noted that if any of the devices they tested actually worked to the extent they were supposed to, the episode would have been one of the most legendary hours of television.

== See also ==
- History of perpetual motion machines
- Corporate Average Fuel Economy
- Emission standard
- Magnetic water treatment
