= Ella Fuller Maitland =

- Born: Ella Sophia Mary Chester; 8 January 1857
- Died: 15 November 1939 (aged 82)
- Occupations: Writer and poet
- Father: Harry Chester

Ella Fuller Maitland (née Ella Sophia Mary Chester; 8 January 1857 – 15 November 1939) was a British novelist and poet, who had considerable success as a writer in the 1890s.

== Life ==
Ella Sophia Mary Chester was born in London on 8 January 1857, the daughter of Harry Chester, a civil servant and the founder of the Highgate Literary and Scientific Institution. She married Robert Fuller-Maitland, and the couple lived in Sidmouth, Devon. She was a member of the Royal Society for the Protection of Animals, and a number of other animal charities.

Maitland published Pages from the Day-book of Bethia Hardacre in 1895, encouraged by Frederick Greenwood. The Times wrote:

It is easier to say what Bethia Hardacre is not than what it is. It is not a novel, because there is no story; we do not say there are no characters. It is not a "commonplace book," because there is nothing commonplace about it; on the contrary, it is strikingly original. Nor is it, as might be assumed from the antiquated Christian name Bethia, a réchauffé of the too familiar, imaginary reminiscences of the Elizabethan period or the Civil Wars. Nor can the book be commended in the ordinary fashion. No higher praise can be bestowed on the sensational or shocking novel of the times than that when you take it up it is impossible to lay it down. But we are always laying down "Bethia Hardacre" as it lulls us into pleasant day-dreams or tempts us to speculative reverie... It mirrors the mind of a cultured woman, with a pure and sensitive poetical taste... There are touches of deep pathos with a genial cynicism which is sensibly sharpened by its evident truth.

1899's The Etchingham Letters, written with Sir Frederick Pollock, was an epistolary novel. Godfrey Frank Singer wrote that:

in The Etchingham Letters (1899), we find a literary correspondence which... is a collaboration. The authors are Sir Frederick Pollock and Ella Fuller Maitland. The two do not seem to have made any obvious division of labor, but to have written together in all the letters regardless of the pretended writer. There is a definite eighteenth-century tone to this book.

== Death ==
Ella Fuller Maitland died on 15 November 1939. In her will, she left £500 to the National Trust; £300 to the RSPCA; £300 to the Men of the Trees: £209 to Our Dumb Friends League; £200 to the Royal Society for the Protection of Birds; and £200 to the Council for the Preservation of Rural England.

== Works ==
- Parva [poems] (1886)
- Verse: rustic and elegiac (1890)
- Pages from the Day-book of Bethia Hardacre (1895)
- The Saltonstall Gazette (1896)
- The Song-book of Bethia Hardacre (1897)
- Pollock, Frederick; Maitland, Ella Fuller (1898). The Etchingham Letters – via Google Books.
- Blanche Esmead: a Story of Diverse Temperaments (1906)
- More Pages from the Day-book of Bethia Hardacre (1907)
- By Land and Water (1911)
- The Clere Family: 1927-1928 with R. Spence Bernard (1929)
