= Viscount Hanworth =

Title in the Peerage of the United Kingdom

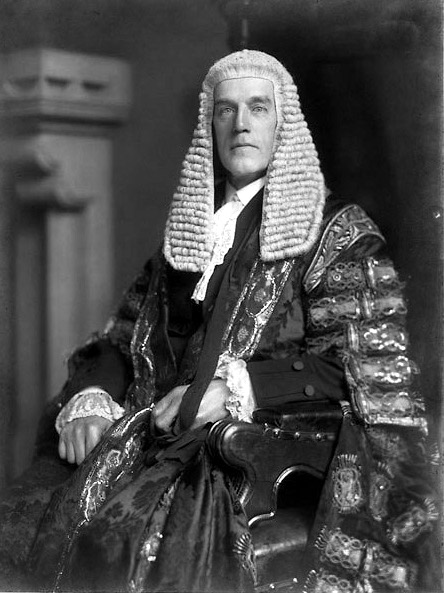
Ernest Pollock, 1st Viscount Hanworth.

Viscount Hanworth, of Hanworth in the County of Middlesex, is a title in the Peerage of the United Kingdom.

The title was created on 17 January 1936 for the judge turned Conservative Member of Parliament who achieved the judicial position of Master of the Rolls, Ernest Pollock, 1st Baron Hanworth. He had already been created a Baronet, of Hanworth in the County of Middlesex, on 27 November 1922, in the Baronetage of the United Kingdom, and Baron Hanworth, of the same territorial designation, on 28 January 1926. As of 2024 the titles are held by his great-grandson, the third Viscount, who succeeded his father in 1996.

== Pollock baronets, of Hanworth (1922) ==
- Ernest Murray Pollock, 1st Baronet (1861–1936) (created Baron Hanworth in 1926)

=== Baron Hanworth (1926) ===
- Ernest Murray Pollock, 1st Baron Hanworth (1861–1936) (created Viscount Hanworth in 1936)

=== Viscount Hanworth (1936) ===
- Ernest Murray Pollock, 1st Viscount Hanworth (1861–1936)
- David Bertram Pollock, 2nd Viscount Hanworth (1916–1996)
- David Stephen Geoffrey Pollock, 3rd Viscount Hanworth (born 1946)

The heir presumptive is the present holder's nephew, Harold William Charles Pollock (born 1988).

=== Title succession chart ===
Title succession chart, Pollock baronets (of Hanworth), Barons Hanworth, and Viscounts Hanworth.

Ernest Pollock; 1st Viscount Hanworth; 1st Baron Hanworth; 1st Baronet; 1861–1936
Capt. Charles Pollock; 1889–1918
David Pollock; 2nd Viscount Hanworth; 1916–1996
David Pollock; 3rd Viscount Hanworth born 1946	Maj. Hon. Charles Pollock; 1951–2005
Capt. Harold Pollock born 1988	Frederick Pollock born 1988
Harold Pollock born 2022

== Arms ==
Coat of arms of Viscount Hanworth
Crest A Boar passant quarterly Or and Vert pierced through the sinister shoulder with an Arrow proper Escutcheon Azure three Fleurs-de-lis within a Bordure engrailed Or on a Chief Ermine two Portcullises of the second Supporters On either side a Bear Or muzzled collared and chained Sable Motto Audacter Et Strenue (Boldly and strenuously)

== Territorial designation ==
In a poor state of repair the large two-storey brick house was built following a fire in 1797 by the Duke of St Albans. What remained of it was later bought with a few acres of attached lawns and fields by the first Viscount however quickly converted into the London Air Park. The Viscount also transferred his Hanworth Park estate to public benefit in the suburb of Hanworth, London. Its later shape is now a mixture of public grassland and recreational amenities such as sports pitches funded by two local charitable clubs and a leisure centre, built by the London borough.

== See also ==
- Pollock baronets, of Hatton, and Pollock baronets, of The Khyber Pass
