= Sir John Pollock, 4th Baronet =

English historian, journalist and translator

Sir John Pollock
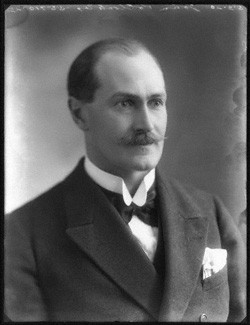
- Born: 26 December 1878
- Died: 22 July 1963 (aged 84)

Sir Frederick John Pollock, 4th Baronet (26 December 1878 – 22 July 1963) was an English historian, journalist and translator.

== Life ==
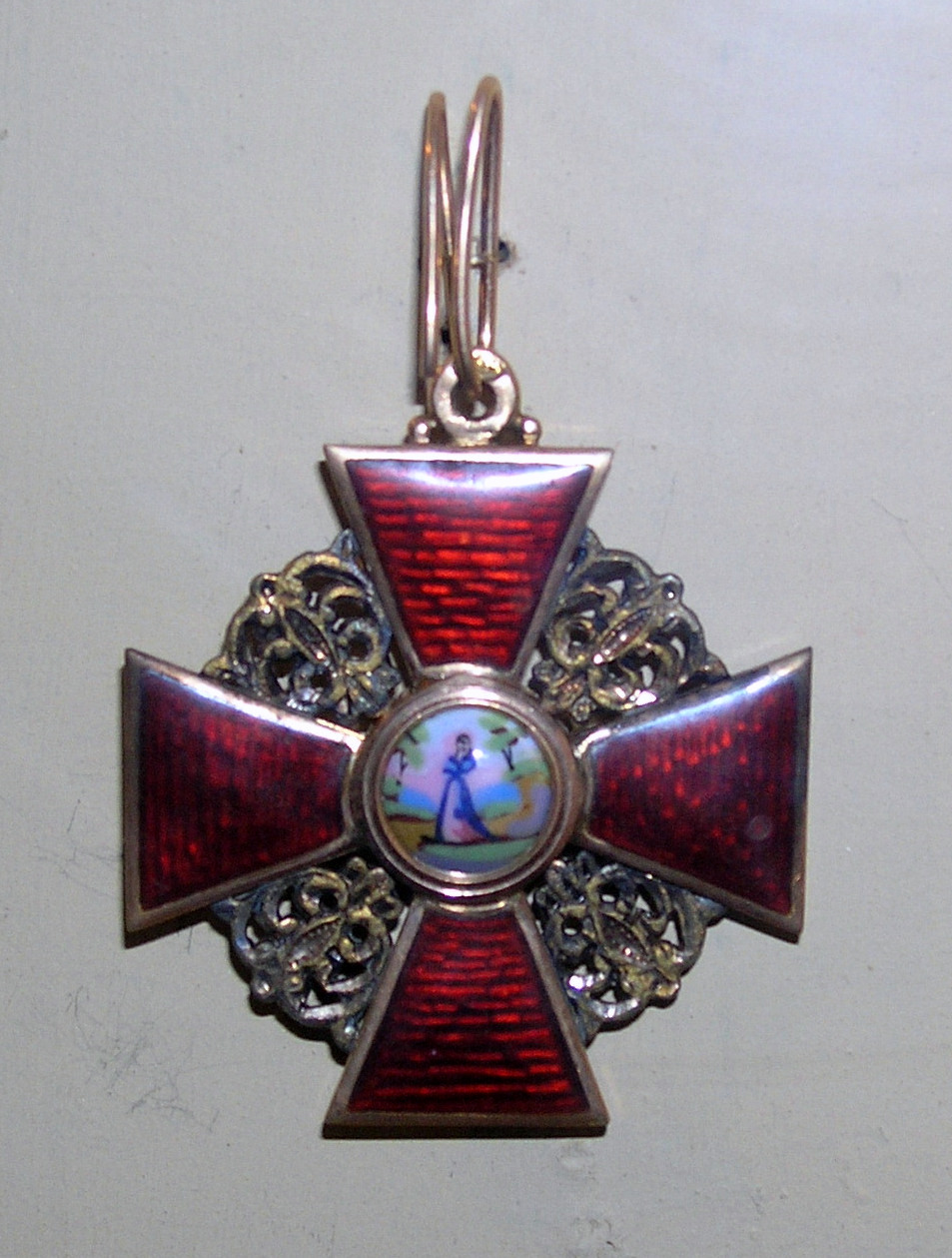
Order of St Anna (Imperial Russia)

John Pollock was the son of Sir Frederick Pollock, 3rd Baronet and Georgina Harriet Deffell, younger daughter of John Deffell, of Calcutta. He was educated at Eton College, graduated in 1900, and continued his education at Trinity College, Cambridge (Bachelor of Arts, Fellow 1902, Master of Arts 1904).

From 1915 to 1919, John Pollock was in Poland and Russia as chief commissioner of the Great Britain to Poland and Galicia Fund under the Russian Red Cross. He was awarded the Order of Saint Anna.

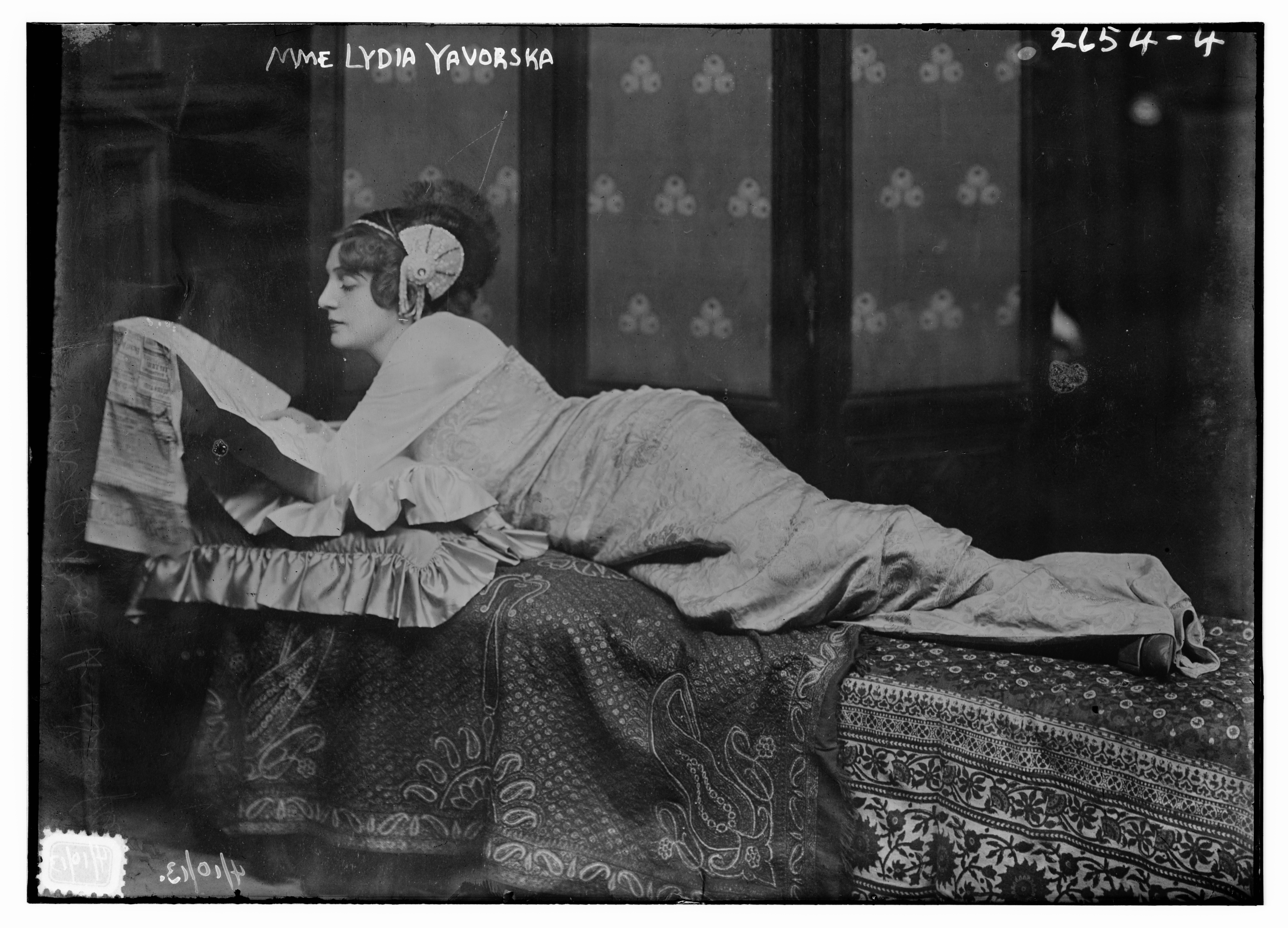
Sir John's first wife Lydia Yavorskaya

In 1920 he married famous Russian actress Lydia Borisovna Yavorskaya (Gubbenet / Hubbenet) (1874–1921), ex-wife of writer prince Vladimir Baryatinskiy. They had no children, and the next year she died.

On 28 April 1925 he married Alix Soubiran, daughter of Jean Julien I'Estom Soubiran, of Bordeaux. She died on 14 April 1968.

Pollock succeeded as 4th Baronet on 18 January 1937. He died on 22 July 1963 at age 84. Pollock's son, George Frederick Pollock (1928–2016), a photographer and inventor, succeeded to the baronetcy.

== Works ==
- The Popish Plot; A Study in the History of the Reign of Charles II. London: Duckworth. 1903 – via Internet Archive.
- Lord Acton at Cambridge (1904)
- Three plays by Eugène Brieux (1911):
  - Damaged Goods, translated by John Pollock
  - Maternity (new version), translated by John Pollock
- War and Revolution in Russia. London: Constable & Co Ltd. 1918 – via Internet Archive.
- The Bolshevik Adventure. London: Constable & Co Ltd. 1919 – via Internet Archive.
- Anatole France himself: a Boswellian record by his secretary, Jean Jacques Brousson (1927, 1934), translated by John Pollock
- The everlasting bonfire (1940), London, Chapman & Hall
- Time's Chariot. London: John Murray. 1950 – via Internet Archive.
- Curtain up. London: P. Davies. 1958 – via Internet Archive.
- Mark De Wolfe Howe, ed. (1961). Holmes-Pollock Letters: The Correspondence of Mr. Justice Holmes and Sir Frederick Pollock, 1874-1932; with Introduction by John Corham Palfrey & Sir John Pollock (2nd ed.). Cambridge, Massachusetts: the Belknap Press of the Harvard University Press – via Internet Archive.
- Twelve One-Acters (1926) The Cayme Press (Plays)
- Listening to Lacoste (1926) Mills & Boon (tennis)
- Paris and Parisians (1929) Geoffrey Bles

Baronetage of the United Kingdom
Preceded by Frederick Pollock	Baronet (of Hatton); 1937–1963	Succeeded by George Pollock
