= Alexander James Duffield =

Alexander James Duffield (c. 1821 – c. 1822 – 9 October 1890), also known as A. J. Duffield, was an English mining engineer, Hispanist and writer.

== Biography ==
Duffield was born between 1821 and 1822 in the village of Tettenhall, Staffordshire (present-day Wolverhampton) to Henry Duffield and Mary Duffield. (Note: Also cited as 1821.) Duffield was baptised on 13 April 1823 in Tettenhall. Initially intending to enter the Church, Duffield studied at Trinity College Dublin but did not take holy orders. On 19 January 1854, Duffield married Louisa Duffield (née McEwen) in Barony, Lanarkshire.

Emigrating to South America, Duffield spent some years in Bolivia and Peru as a mining chemist, and learning Spanish. He had plans, which proved unsuccessful, to introduce alpacas into Australia, several times visited Brisbane, and reported to the Queensland government on labour for the sugar plantations. Subsequently, he travelled in Spain and other countries, and for some time held an appointment under the government of Canada.

On 9 October 1890, Duffield died aged 68. 7 objects collected by Duffield from Oceania are held in the British Museum.

== Works ==
Duffield published:

- Masston: a Story of these Modern Days (London, 1877), novel, with Walter Herries Pollock.
- Peru in the Guano Age: being a short Account of a recent Visit to the Guano Deposits, with some Reflections on the Money they have produced and the Uses to which it has been applied (1877).
- Needless Misery at Home and abounding Treasure in the West under our own Flag; Old Town and New Domains, or Birmingham and Canada revisited (1880), advocacy of English parishes purchasing land in Canada .
- The Prospects of Peru, the End of the Guano Age and a Description thereof, with some Account of the Guano Deposits and "Nitrate" Plains (1881).
- Don Quixote (1881, translator), as The Ingenious Knight Don Quixote de la Mancha, a New Translation from the Originals of 1605 and 1608, with some Notes of Bowie, J. A. Pellicer, Clemencin, and others (1881, 3 vols.) This was work begun with Henry Edward Watts, of which two separate versions appeared. It had a bibliographical account of the books of chivalry connected with the story, and passages in verse rendered by James Young Gibson.
- Don Quixote, his Critics and Commentators, with a brief Account of the Minor Works of Cervantes and a Statement of the Aim of the greatest of them all (1881).
- The Beauty of the World: a Story of this Generation, 1886 [1885], 3 vols.
- Recollections of Travels Abroad (1889).

Duffield also contributed a note on "The Lost Art of Hardening Copper" to Heinrich Schliemann's Ilios; the City and Country of the Trojans (Leipzig, 1880).
