= Lawrence Vambe =

Zimbabwean writer and journalist (1917–2019)

Lawrence Vambe MBE (1917–2019) was a Zimbabwean writer and journalist.

== Early life ==
Vambe was born in the village of Chishawasha in what was then Southern Rhodesia. His father, Joseph, was a peasant farmer; his mother died when he was a baby due to the influenza epidemic. He was then raised by Jesuit missionaries.

== Education ==
He attended Kutama College, the same school as Robert Mugabe, before embarking on teacher training in South Africa at South African Native College, which became University of Fort Hare.

== Journalism career ==
He quit teaching after five years, and decided to become a journalist. He joined African newspapers where he rose through the ranks to become editor-in-chief. Besides an illustrious journalism career, Vambe also developed a reputation as an important black intellectual who significantly contributed to the struggle against colonialism in Rhodesia. He published two books, An Ill-Fated People: Zimbabwe Before and After Rhodes (1972) and From Rhodesia to Zimbabwe (1976). This made him one of the pioneering Black writers from Zimbabwe. He was awarded the MBE in 1959. In the 1980s he was one of the founders of the Britain-Zimbabwe Society, an organisation which continues to this day.

== Personal life ==
He was married to Cathleen Rolands with whom he had three daughters and one son. After they divorced, he remarried Kay Boyer and had two daughters, and that also ended in divorce. His daughter Elizabeth, from his first marriage, married Stephen Pollock, 3rd Viscount Hanworth.
