= Channing Pollock =

Channing Pollock may refer to:

- Channing Pollock (writer) (1880–1946), American playwright and critic
- Channing Pollock (magician) (1926–2006), American magician and actor

== See also ==
- Pollock (surname)
