= Sir Frederick Pollock, 3rd Baronet =

British jurist (1845–1937)

The Right Honourable Sir Frederick Pollock Bt PC FBA
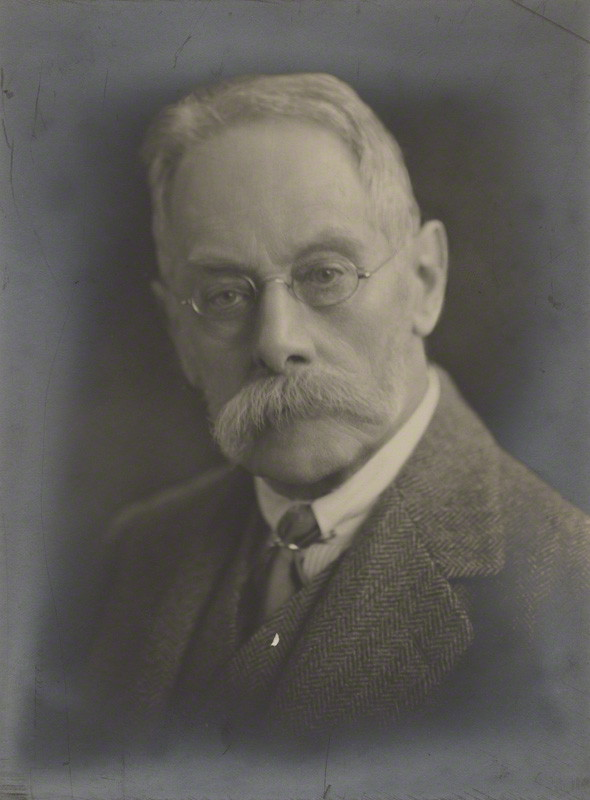
- Born: 10 December 1845; London, England
- Died: 18 January 1937 (aged 91); London, England
- Education: Trinity College, Cambridge
- Occupation: academic
- Title: Corpus Professor of Jurisprudence at Oxford University
- Predecessor: Henry Maine
- Successor: Paul Vinogradoff
- Spouse: Georgina Harriet Deffell (m. 1876; died 1935)
- Children: John Pollock and Alice Isabella Pollock
- Parent(s): William Frederick Pollock (father); Juliet Creed (mother)
- Relatives: Walter Herries Pollock (brother)

Sir Frederick Pollock, 3rd Baronet, PC, FBA (10 December 1845 – 18 January 1937) was an English jurist best known for his History of English Law before the Time of Edward I, written with F.W. Maitland, and his lifelong correspondence with US Supreme Court Justice Oliver Wendell Holmes. He was a member of the Cambridge Apostles.

== Life ==
Pollock was the eldest son of William Frederick Pollock, Master of the Court of Exchequer, and Juliet Creed, daughter of the Rev, Harry Creed. He was the grandson of Sir Frederick Pollock, 1st Baronet, Lord Chief Baron of the Exchequer, the great-nephew of Field Marshal Sir George Pollock, 1st Baronet, and the first cousin of Ernest Pollock, 1st Viscount Hanworth, Master of the Rolls.

He was educated at Eton College, where he was a King's Scholar. He then studied at Trinity College, Cambridge. He won the Pitt Scholarship in 1865, was Browne's Medallist in 1866, and graduated with his Bachelor of Arts (BA) degree as Chancellor's Medallist (top classics student) in 1867.

He was elected fellow of his alma mater in 1868 (later Honourable Fellow in 1920). In 1871 he was admitted to the Bar. He wrote a series of textbooks that took a new approach to the teaching of English Law including The Principles of Contract at Law and in Equity (1876) and The Law of Torts (1887).

Rather than relying on specific applications of law, these works emphasised underlying principles. They acted as models for future textbooks and helped modernise English legal education. Pollock taught at the University of Oxford (1883–1903), as Corpus Professor of Jurisprudence. He was Professor of Common Law in the Inns of Court (1884–1890). He was Editor of the Law Reports from 1895 to 1935. He was the first editor of the Law Quarterly Review which was founded in 1885. He was also, in 1894, the Chairman of The Society of Authors He was sworn of the Privy Council in 1911. He was elected Treasurer of Lincoln's Inn in 1931.

== Family ==
Pollock married on 13 August 1873 to Georgina Harriet Deffell (died on 30 March 1935), a daughter of John Deffell. They had two children:

- Alice Isabella Pollock, born on 15 June 1876, died on 28 June 1953. Married first at St Marylebone Parish Church in London on 19 November 1902 to Sydney Waterlow (1878–1944), a diplomat and grandson of Sir Sydney Waterlow, 1st Baronet. This marriage was annulled in 1912, and she remarried the same year Captain Orlando Cyprian Williams, MC, CB (d.1967).
- Frederick John Pollock (1878–1963), a noted historian, who succeeded to the baronetcy.

== Fencing ==
Together with his younger brother, Walter Herries Pollock, he participated in the first English revival of historical fencing, originated by Alfred Hutton and his colleagues Egerton Castle, Captain Carl Thimm, Colonel Cyril Matthey, Captain Percy Rolt, Captain Ernest George Stenson Cooke, Captain Frank Herbert Whittow.

He was cited in an 1897 slander case involving the London Fencing Club when Sir John Hutton was sued by a French naval officer, Rene Martin Fortris, who accused Hutton of falsely stating that Fortris had been making unwelcome advances towards his daughter for two years. According to Fortris, this led to Sir Frederick Pollock and John Norbury declining his application for membership of the London Fencing Club. The jury was unimpressed by Fortris's case and found in favour of Sir John Hutton.

== Works ==
- The Principles of Contract at Law and in Equity: Being a Treatise of the General Principles Concerning the Validity of Agreements, With a Special View to the Comparison of Law and Equity, and with References to the Indian Contract Act, and Occasionally to Roman, American, and Continental Law (1st ed.). London: Stevens and Sons. 1876 – via Internet Archive.; 9th edition, 1921.
- A Digest of the Law of Partnership. F.H. Thomas and Company, St. Louis, 1878
- The Law of Torts, a treatise on the principles of obligations arising from civil wrongs in the common law: to which is added the draft of a code of civil wrongs, prepared for the government of India (2nd ed.). London: Stevens and Sons, Limited. 1890 – via Internet Archive.
- Leading Cases Done into English. London: Macmillan and Co. 1876 – via Internet Archive.; 2nd edition, 1892
- Spinoza, His Life and Philosophy. London: C. Kegan Paul & Co. 1880 – via Internet Archive. volume II
- Essays in Jurisprudence and Ethics. London: Macmillan and Co. 1882 – via Internet Archive.
- The Land Laws (2nd ed.). Macmillan and Co.: London and New York. 1887 – via Internet Archive.
- Oxford Lectures and Other Discourses. London: Macmillan and Co. 1890 – via Internet Archive.
- Pollock, Frederick; Maitland, Frederic William (1895). History of English Law before the Time of Edward I. Vol. I (1st ed.). Cambridge & Boston: Cambridge University Press & Little, Brown & Company – via Internet Archive.; volume II
- An Introduction to the History of the Science of Politics. London: Macmillan and Co. 1895 – via Internet Archive.
- A First Book of Jurisprudence For Students of the Common Law (1st ed.). London: Macmillan and Co., Ltd. 1896 – via Internet Archive.; 4th edition, 1918; 6th edition, 1929.
- The Expansion of the Common Law. London: Stevens and Sons, Limited. 1904 – via Internet Archive.
- Benton, Alexander Wood, ed. (1897). "General Introduction". Encyclopædia of the Laws of England: being a New Abridgment by the Most Eminent Legal Authorities. Vol. I. London & Edinburgh: Sweet & Maxwell; Wm. Green & Sons. pp. 1–13 – via Internet Archive.
- The Etchingham Letters. Dodd, Mead & company. 1898. With Ella Fuller Maitland
- Locke's Theory of the State. London: for the British Academy by Henry Frowde. 1904.
- Pollock, Frederick (1911). "Contract" . In Chisholm, Hugh (ed.). Encyclopædia Britannica. Vol. 07 (11th ed.). Cambridge University Press. pp. 35–40.
- Pollock, Frederick (1911). "Tort" . In Chisholm, Hugh (ed.). Encyclopædia Britannica. Vol. 27 (11th ed.). Cambridge University Press. pp. 64–66.
- The Genius of Common Law (Columbia University Lectures). New York: The Columbia University Press. 1912 – via Internet Archive.
- Introduction and Notes to Sir Henry Maine's "Ancient Law". London: John Murray. 1914 – via Internet Archive.
- German "Truth" and European Facts About the War. London: The Central Committee for National Patriotic Organizations. 1915 – via Internet Archive.
- James Bryce; Frederick Pollock; Edward Clarke; Kenelm Edward Digby; Alfred Hopkinson; H. A. L. Fisher; Harold Cox (1915). Report of the Committee on Alleged German Outrages Appointed by His Britannic Majesty's Government and Presided over by The Right Hon. Viscount Bryce, O.M., &c. New York: Macmillan Company – via Internet Archive.
- The League of Nations. London: Stevens and Sons, Limited. 1920 – via Internet Archive.
- Essays in the Law. London: Macmillan and CO., Limited. 1922 – via Internet Archive.
- Outside the law: diversions partly serious. London: Cayme Press. 1927.
- Pollock, Frederick, ed. (1927). Table Talk of John Selden. London: Quaritch. hdl:2027/wu.89094713427 – via HathiTrust.
- For My Grandson, Remembrances of an Ancient Victorian. London: John Murray. 1933 – via Internet Archive.

=== Articles ===
- Pollock, Frederick (July 1876). "Evolution and Ethics". Mind. 1 (3): 334–345. JSTOR 2246593.
- Pollock, Frederick (April 1878). "Notes on the Philosophy of Spinoza". Mind. 3 (10): 195–212. JSTOR 2246928.
- Pollock, Frederick (January 1879). "Marcus Aurelius and the Stoic Philosophy". Mind. 4 (13): 47–68. JSTOR 2246564.
- Pollock, Frederick (15 March 1893). "Contracts in Early English Law". Harvard Law Review. 6 (8): 389–404. doi:10.2307/1321304. JSTOR 1321304.
- Pollock, Frederick (26 November 1894). "Divisions of Law". Harvard Law Review. 8 (4): 187–199. doi:10.2307/1321786. JSTOR 1321786.
- Pollock, Frederick (26 December 1894). "Sovereignty in English Law". Harvard Law Review. 8 (5): 243–251. doi:10.2307/1321473. JSTOR 1321473.
- Pollock, Frederick (25 December 1895). "Justice According to Law". Harvard Law Review. 9 (5): 295–308. doi:10.2307/1321452. JSTOR 1321452.
- Pollock, Frederick (August 1895). "International Jurisprudence". The Advocate of Peace. 57 (8): 179. JSTOR 20665338.
- "Sir James Fitzjames Stephen". National Review: 817-823. August 1895 – via Internet Archive.
- Pollock, Frederick (25 February 1898). "The Continuity of the Common Law". Harvard Law Review. 11 (7): 423–433. doi:10.2307/1322086. JSTOR 1322086.
- Pollock, Frederick (25 November 1898). "The King's Justice in the Early Middle Ages". Harvard Law Review. 12 (4): 227–242. doi:10.2307/1322106. JSTOR 1322106.
- Pollock, Frederick (January 1901). "The History of the Law of Nature: A Preliminary Study". Columbia Law Review. 1 (1): 11–32. doi:10.2307/1109748. JSTOR 1109748.
- Pollock, Frederick (March 1902). "The History of the Law of Nature: A Preliminary Study. Second Article". Columbia Law Review. 2 (3): 131–143. doi:10.2307/1108986. JSTOR 1108986.
- Pollock, Frederick (December 1902). "The Sources of International Law". Columbia Law Review. 2 (8): 511–524. doi:10.2307/1109395. JSTOR 1109395.
- "Sir Frederick Pollock's Visit to Michigan". Michigan Law Review. 2 (2): 128–134. November 1903. doi:10.2307/1272755. JSTOR 1272755.
- "The Law of Reason". Michigan Law Review. 2 (3): 159–179. December 1903. doi:10.2307/1273779. JSTOR 1273779.
- Pollock, Frederick (January 1904). "The Merger Case and Restraint of Trade". Harvard Law Review. 17 (3): 151–155. doi:10.2307/1323311. JSTOR 1323311.
- Pollock, Frederick (December 1903). "The Expansion of the Common Law. I. The Foundations of Justice". Columbia Law Review. 3 (8): 505–525. doi:10.2307/1109119. JSTOR 1109119.
- Pollock, Frederick (January 1904). "The Expansion of the Common Law. II. The Scales of Justice". Columbia Law Review. 4 (1): 12–32. doi:10.2307/1109999. JSTOR 1109999.
- Pollock, Frederick (February 1904). "Expansion of the Common Law. III. The Sword of Justice". Columbia Law Review. 4 (2): 96–115. doi:10.2307/1109167. JSTOR 1109167.
- Pollock, Frederick (March 1904). "The Expansion of the Common Law. IV. The Law of Reason". Columbia Law Review. 4 (3): 171–194. doi:10.2307/1109377. JSTOR 1109377.
- "Reviewed Work: The Law of Torts". Columbia Law Review. 6 (3): 208–210. March 1906. doi:10.2307/1109850. JSTOR 1109850.
- "Frederic William Maitland". Quarterly Review (411): 401-419. April 1907 – via Internet Archive.
- Pollock, Frederick (March 1912). "The Genius of the Common Law. I. Our Lady and Her Knights". Columbia Law Review. 12 (3): 189–198. doi:10.2307/1110780. JSTOR 1110780.
- Pollock, Frederick (April 1912). "The Genius of the Common Law. II. The Giants and the Gods". Columbia Law Review. 12 (4): 291–300. doi:10.2307/1110796. JSTOR 1110796.
- Pollock, Frederick (May 1912). "The Genius of the Common Law. III. Surrebutter Castle". Columbia Law Review. 12 (5): 387–394. doi:10.2307/1110181. JSTOR 1110181.
- Pollock, Frederick (June 1912). "The Genius of the Common Law. IV. Enemies in the Gate". Columbia Law Review. 12 (6): 481–495. doi:10.2307/1110930. JSTOR 1110930.
- Pollock, Frederick (November 1912). "The Genius of the Common Law. V. Rescue and Ransom". Columbia Law Review. 12 (7): 577–588. doi:10.2307/1110388. JSTOR 1110388.
- Pollock, Frederick (December 1912). "The Genius of the Common Law. VI. Alliance and Conquest". Columbia Law Review. 12 (8): 659–672. doi:10.2307/1110877. JSTOR 1110877.
- Pollock, Frederick (January 1913). "The Genius of the Common Law. VII. Perils of the Market-Place". Columbia Law Review. 13 (1): 1–12. doi:10.2307/1110272. JSTOR 1110272.
- Pollock, Frederick (February 1913). "The Genius of the Common Law. VIII. The Perpetual Quest". Columbia Law Review. 13 (2): 93–103. doi:10.2307/1110134. JSTOR 1110134.
- Pollock, Frederick (April 1916). "Cosmopolitan Custom and International Law". Harvard Law Review. 29 (6): 565–581. doi:10.2307/1326494. JSTOR 1326494.
- "Symposium: The Problem of Nationality Elie Halévy, Marcel Mauss, Théodore Ruyssen, René Johannet, Gilbert Murray, Frederick Pollock". Proceedings of the Aristotelian Society. New Series. 20: 237–265. 1919. JSTOR 4543993.
- "James Bryce". Quarterly Review (471): 400-414. April 1922 – via Internet Archive.
- "Reviewed Work: The Declaration of Independence: A Study in the History of Political Ideas by Carl Becker". Harvard Law Review. 36 (5): 631–632. March 1923. doi:10.2307/1328272. JSTOR 1328272.
- "Ilbert, Courtenay Peregrine, 1841-1924 - Proceedings of the British Academy" (PDF). The British Academy. pp. 441–445.

== See also ==
- Alfred Hutton
- HEMA

Baronetage of the United Kingdom
Preceded by William Frederick Pollock	Baronet (of Hatton); 1888–1937	Succeeded by Sir Frederick John Pollock
