= David Pollock =

David Pollock may refer to:

- David Pollock (judge) (1780–1847), British judge in India
- David Pollock (actor) (born 1961), former American child actor
- David Pollock (rugby union) (born 1987), rugby union player for Ulster Rugby
- David Pollock, 3rd Viscount Hanworth (born 1946), British peer, academic and Labour member of the House of Lords
- David Pollock (humanist) (1942–2023), British secular humanist
- Dave Pollock (born 1942), former Australian politician
- David C. Pollock (1939–2004), sociologist

== See also ==
- David Pollack (born 1984), American football player
- David Pollack (politician)
