= Quentin Edwards =

British barrister and circuit judge (1925-2010)

Quentin Edwards QC
- Born: Quentin Tytler Edwards; 16 January 1925; Alexandria, Egypt
- Died: 19 December 2010 (aged 85); Highgate, London, England
- Education: Bradfield College
- Occupations: Barrister, Circuit judge, Chancellor and author
- Spouse: Barbara Marion Guthrie
- Children: Three
- Writing career
- Notable awards: Queen's Counsel

His Honour Quentin Tytler Edwards QC (16 January 1925 – 19 December 2010) was a British barrister and circuit judge.

A specialist in ecclesiastical law, he was also Chancellor of two Church of England dioceses and was a contributor to Halsbury's Laws of England.

== Early life ==
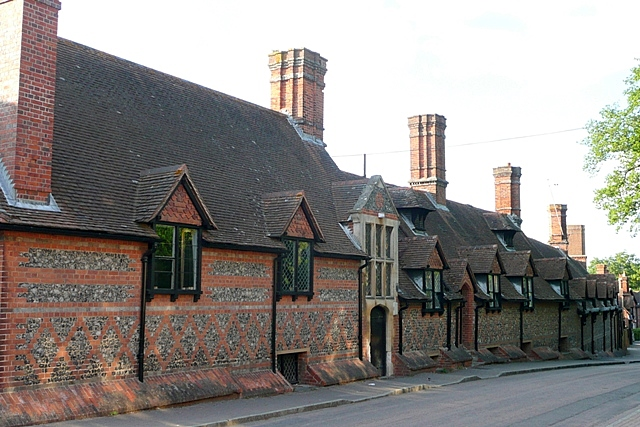
Bradfield College

Edwards was born in Alexandria, Egypt, the son of Juliet and Herbert, who was a partner in the shipping brokerage R. J. Moss & Co. After early schooling in Alexandria and Hastings he went to Bradfield College. In his final year, on a visit to Oxford, he struck up a friendship with John Mortimer, who became infatuated with him, leading to passionate letters from Mortimer. When found by a schoolmaster, in July 1942, these resulted in Mortimer being sent down from Oxford, and Edwards being "asked not to return" to Bradfield at the age of seventeen. He then went to work on a farm on the Berkshire Downs, where he burnt the letters. He also worked briefly as an apprentice at the British Thomson-Houston factory in Rugby before joining the Royal Navy.

His naval career commenced in January 1943 at Edinburgh University on a six-month course for naval candidates, designed to turn schoolboys into officer material, where he was taught by Dover Wilson amongst other lecturers. A friend and fellow student was Peter Shand Kydd who, in 1969, became Princess Diana's stepfather when he married Frances Spencer, the divorced wife of Viscount Althorp. After completing his basic training in August 1943, Ordinary Seaman Edwards was posted to HMS London just in time to witness the ship's inspection by King George VI. After a brief spell on the London and further training at HMS King Alfred and elsewhere, in March 1944 he was promoted to midshipman and posted to the destroyer HMS Fury. On 21 June 1944, having been part of the D-Day bombardment force, HMS Fury detonated a ground mine off Juno Beach and was forced to beach west of Arromanches. Promotion to Sub Lieutenant followed, along with a posting in January 1945 to HMS Totland then being refitted at Durban. His final posting from November 1945 was to Landing Ship Tank HMS3504 in Calcutta before being demobbed at Helensburgh in October 1946.

== Career ==
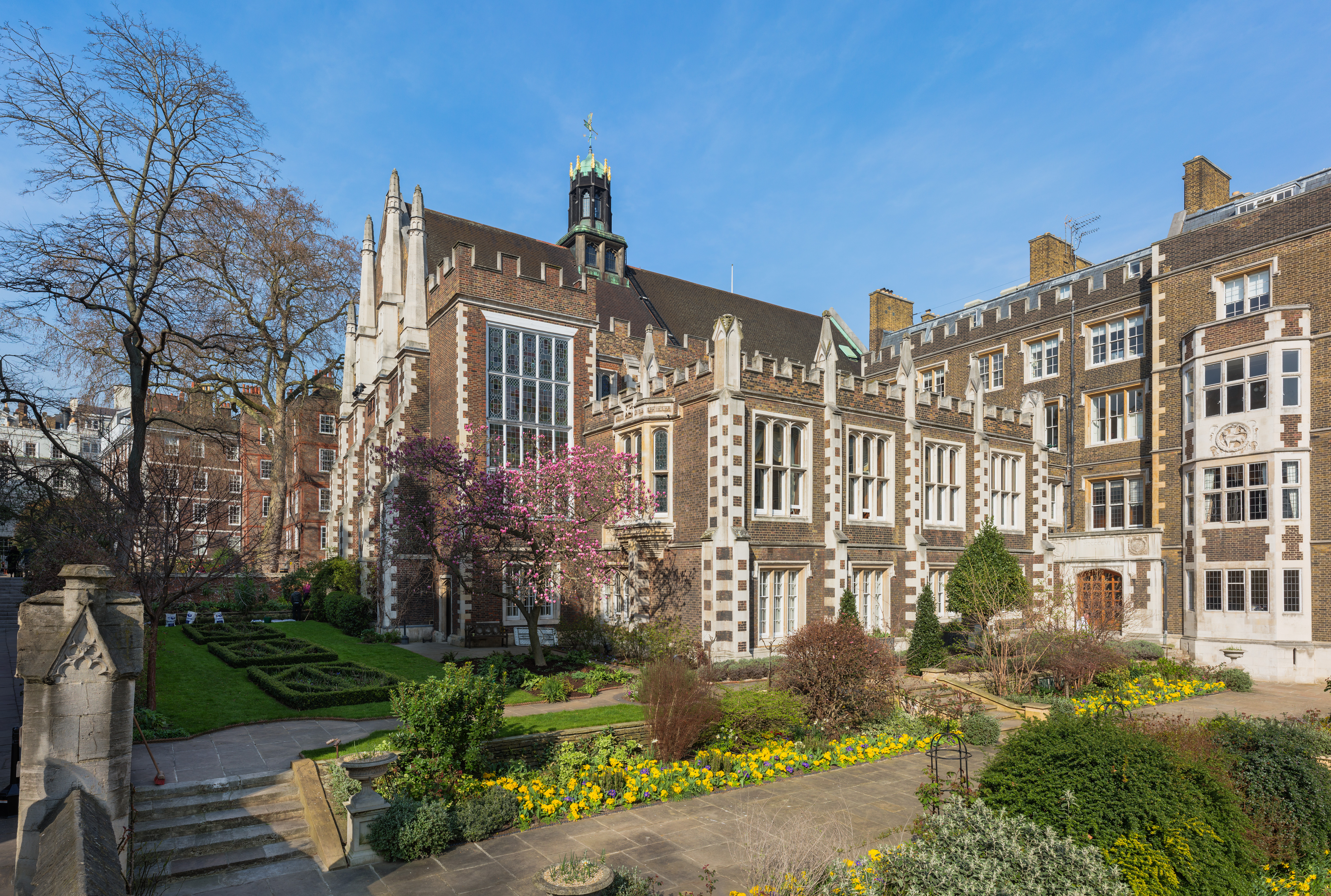
Middle Temple Hall

After the Navy he read law at the Middle Temple and was called to the bar from there in 1948. As a junior barrister, he had a mixed practice before concentrating on licensing and ecclesiastical law. Unusually, he was elected as a bencher of his inn before having achieved other senior appointment, a mark of popularity. In December 1974, he was appointed a Recorder, in April 1975 a Queen's Counsel, and in 1982 a circuit judge on the South Eastern circuit. He continued in that post for fifteen years, mainly sitting at the Bloomsbury and Marylebone County Court in Park Crescent, and was also Chancellor in two dioceses, Chichester and Blackburn. In his specialist field of ecclesiastical law, Edwards was a contributor to Halsbury's Laws of England.

== Private life ==
On the day after he had been called to the bar, 18 November 1948, at St Mary Abbots, Kensington, Edwards married Barbara Marion Guthrie, the daughter of Colonel A. Guthrie, late Royal Engineers, of Hampstead. His mother was no longer alive, and his father was living at Rannoch Lodge, Burgess Hill, West Sussex. With his wife, Edwards had a daughter and two sons. Barbara Edwards died in 2006.

The Times said of Edwards in an obituary that he was a dandy and a Wodehouse-style figure, "instantly recognisable with his abundant sidewhiskers, half-moon spectacles and rosy cheeks", and that he was at his happiest at race meetings, especially Royal Ascot, Newmarket, Cheltenham, and the greyhound races at Hackney and Harringey. In his ecclesiastical role, he would visit churches in the morning and then go to a race meeting in the afternoon. Christopher Hill recalled that Edwards was "a stickler for propriety and good manners ... quixotic, urbane, and wickedly amusing ... occasionally irascible."

Edwards lived in Highgate, North London, for some fifty years from 1954 and became a well-known supporter of community activities there, including being a founder member of the Highgate Society and a president of the Highgate Literary and Scientific Institution for six years. He died on 19 December 2010.

== Selected publications ==
- With Harold Peter Bourner DOW, Public Rights of Way and Access to the Countryside (London : Shaw & Sons, 1951)
- Shaw's Guide to Rent Control and the Increase of Rents (London: Shaw & Sons, 1957)
- What is Unlawful? Does innocence begin where crime ends? Afterthoughts on the Wolfenden Report (Published for the Church of England Moral Welfare Council by the Church Information Office, 1959)
