= Pogue (surname) =

Pogue is the surname name of:

- Alan Pogue (born 1946), American photojournalist
- Charles Edward Pogue (born 1950), American film and television writer
- Charles Nelson Pogue (1897–1985), inventor of a miracle carburettor for petrol engines
- David Pogue (born 1963), Yahoo! Finance columnist, formerly New York Times
- Donald C. Pogue (1947–2016), American judge
- Forrest Pogue (1912–1996), US Army historian
- Harold Pogue (1893–1969), American football player and businessman
- Jamie Pogue (born 1977), Canadian baseball coach
- Ken Pogue (1934–2015), Canadian actor
- L. Welch Pogue (1899–2003), American aviation attorney
- William R. Pogue (1930–2014), American astronaut

== See also ==
- The Pogues (band), a band of mixed Irish and English background
- H & S Pogue, American department store in Ohio
- Pogue's Run, creek in Indiana named after George Pogue
- Battle of Pogue's Run, American Civil War incident or "battle" in 1863
- Pogue, a derogatory term
