= Harry Chester =

British civil servant

Harry Chester (1 October 1806 – 5 October 1868) was a British civil servant who spent most of his career in the Privy Council Office.

He published one book, The Lay of the Lady Ellen, a tale of 1834, and is best remembered as the founder of the Highgate Literary and Scientific Institution.

== Early life ==
The third son of Sir Robert Chester, Master of Ceremonies to King George III, George IV, and William IV, Chester was born in Ipswich and educated at Charterhouse and Westminster before joining Trinity College, Cambridge, where he matriculated on 12 June 1824. He became a scholar of the college in 1825, but Alumni Cantabrigienses does not say that he took a degree.

== Career ==
After leaving Cambridge, Chester briefly served in the diplomatic service. In 1826, he was appointed as a Clerk in the Office of the Privy Council, in which he spent the rest of his career. He rose to be Permanent secretary to the Privy Council Committee on Education and was also a Justice of the Peace for the county of Middlesex.

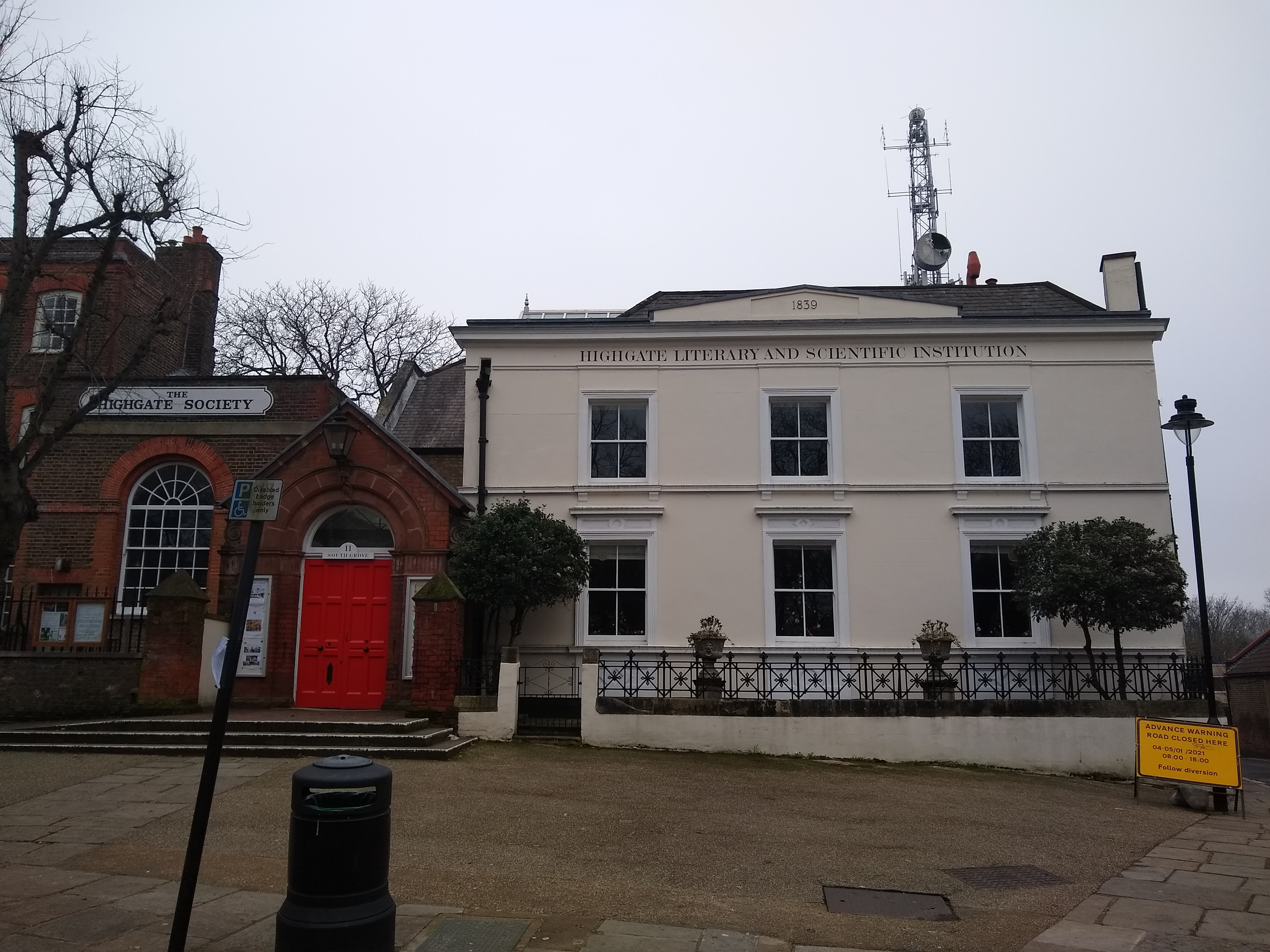
The HLSI building

On 16 January 1839, Chester called a meeting at the Gate House Tavern, Highgate, "for the purpose of forming an institution designed to excite and cultivate an intelligent interest in the objects of Literature and Science". This was to be for all classes and both sexes, and seventy-six people put their names down to become members. It was named as the Highgate Literary and Scientific Institution. The Institution flourished, and Chester took office as its first president and so continued until 1858.

Chester retired from the Privy Council office in 1856. An obituary in The Gentleman's Magazine noted that in his official role he had been in contact with many of the clergy and landed gentry, "with whom his courtesy made him generally popular".

== Personal life ==
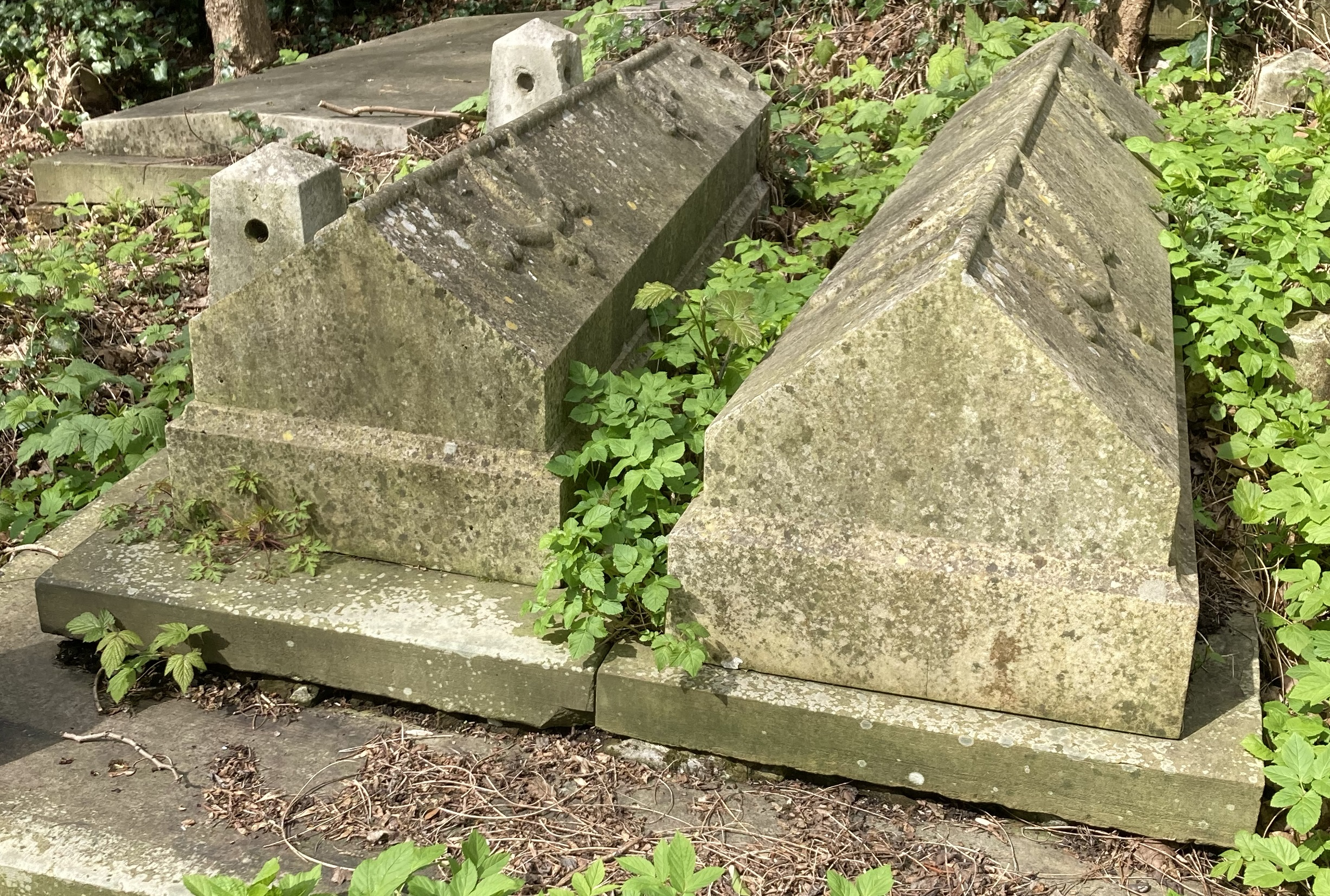
Grave of Harry Chester in Highgate Cemetery

On 2 September 1837, at St Michael's Church, Highgate, Chester married firstly Anna Maria Isherwood, a daughter of Robert Isherwood, Esq. They had a son, Robert, and two daughters, Dulcibella Fanny and Caroline Mary. His wife died in 1854 in the parish of St George Hanover Square. On 24 March 1856, Chester married secondly Henrietta Mary, daughter of George Goff. By 1861, they had a four-year-old daughter, Ella Sophia.

Chester died at 63, Rutland Gate, Westminster, on 5 October 1868, aged sixty-two and was buried on the western side of Highgate Cemetery. Probate on his estate was granted to his widow, Henrietta Mary Chester, of that address. In 1871, Mrs Chester was living in Brighton with her children Ella, Leonora, Henrietta, and Harry Chester, her step-daughter Caroline, and eight servants. The census of 1901 finds her at Poplar Hall, Birchanger, Essex, with a small grandson and five servants, and gives her birthplace as Florence.

== Published work ==
Chester was the author of The Lay of the Lady Ellen, a tale of 1834, first published in 1835 and reissued in a facsimile edition in 2010. A long narrative poem, the work was reviewed by The New Monthly Magazine, which described it as “a tragedy founded on Anglo-Saxon history, and of a well-sustained interest, although the metre proves the writer to have been too careless of the rhythm of his lines”.
