= Andrew Pollock =

Andrew Pollock is the name of two cricketers:

- Andrew Maclean Pollock (1914–1969), Scottish-born South African cricketer
- Andrew Graeme Pollock (born 1969), South African cricketer, grandson of Andrew Maclean Pollock

== See also ==
- Pollock (surname)
