= David Pollock, 3rd Viscount Hanworth =

British econometrician and peer (born 1946)

The Right Honourable The Viscount Hanworth
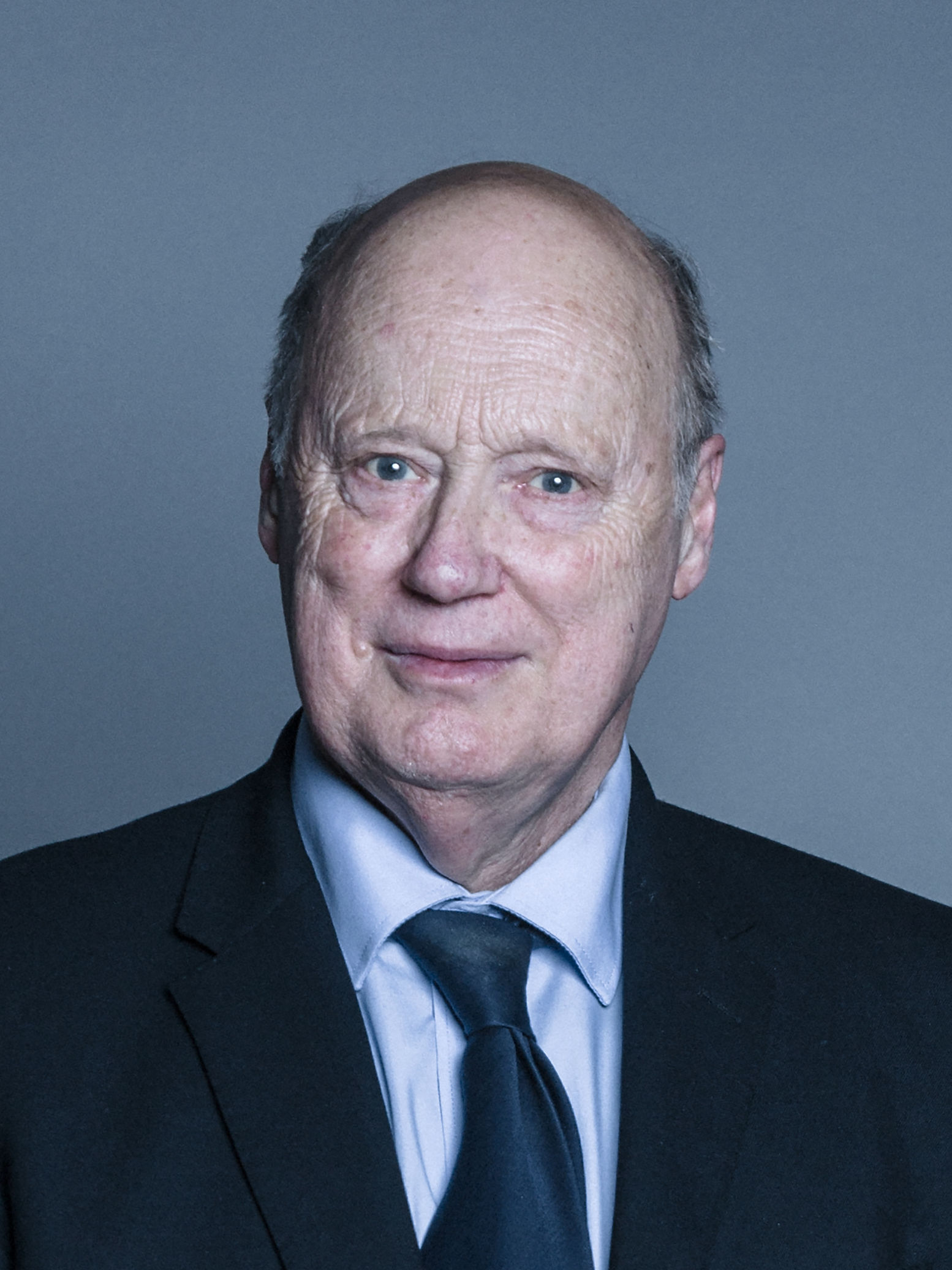
- Official portrait, 2018

Member of the House of Lords
- Lord Temporal
- Hereditary peerage 23 October 1996 – 11 November 1999
- Preceded by: The 2nd Viscount Hanworth
- Succeeded by: Seat abolished
- Elected Hereditary Peer; 30 March 2011 – 29 April 2026
- By-election: 2011
- Preceded by: The 11th Baron Strabolgi
- Succeeded by: Seat abolished

Personal details
- Born: David Stephen Geoffrey Pollock; 16 February 1946 (age 80)
- Party: Labour
- Spouse: Elizabeth Vambe
- Children: 2
- Education: Wellington College; University of Sussex (DPhil)
- Other titles: 3rd Baron Hanworth; 3rd Baronet

David Stephen Geoffrey Pollock, 3rd Viscount Hanworth (born 16 February 1946), is a British professor and a former Labour elected hereditary peer.

Hanworth was educated at Wellington College and has taken a DPhil degree at the University of Sussex. He is currently Professor of Econometrics and Computational Statistics at the University of Leicester, where he lectures in Mathematical Statistics, Econometrics and Environmental Sciences.

== Background ==
A great-grandson of Ernest Pollock, 1st Viscount Hanworth, a former Master of the Rolls, Hanworth succeeded to the viscountcy upon his father's death in 1996 and took his seat in the House of Lords until the House of Lords Act in 1999 removed his automatic right to sit in Parliament. He chose not to stand in the election by Labour hereditary peers to select two of their number to remain in Parliament after this Act came into force. Hanworth stood but was unsuccessful in the by-election caused by the death of Lord Milner in 2003. Willing to work in the Lords still, in 2011 he won the cross-house hereditary by-election to become one of fifteen 'deputy speakers', following the death of Lord Strabolgi, who was also Labour. He was therefore appointed/elected on the all hereditary-peer eligibility basis following a death of the holder one of the 90 places which remained based on heredity.

== Personal life ==
In 1968, he married Elizabeth Liberty Vambe, daughter of writer and journalist Lawrence Vambe. They live in London and have two daughters:

- Hon. Cecile Pollock (born 1971)
- Hon. Charlotte Pollock (born 1973)

As they have no sons, Lord Hanworth's titles are expected to pass to a nephew.

== Arms ==
Coat of arms of David Pollock, 3rd Viscount Hanworth
Crest A Boar passant quarterly Or and Vert pierced through the sinister shoulder with an Arrow proper Escutcheon Azure three Fleurs-de-lis within a Bordure engrailed Or on a Chief Ermine two Portcullises of the second Supporters On either side a Bear Or muzzled collared and chained Sable Motto Audacter Et Strenue (Boldly and strenuously)

== Notes ==
Peerage of the United Kingdom
Preceded by David Pollock	Viscount Hanworth; 1996–present Member of the House of Lords (1996–1999)	Incumbent; Heir presumptive: Harold Pollock
Preceded by David Pollock	Baron Hanworth; 1996–present	Incumbent; Heir presumptive: Harold Pollock
Baronetage of the United Kingdom
Preceded by David Pollock	Pollock baronets of Hanworth; 1996–present	Incumbent; Heir presumptive: Harold Pollock
Parliament of the United Kingdom
Preceded by The Lord Strabolgi	Elected hereditary peer to the House of Lords under the House of Lords Act 1999; 2011–2026	Position abolished under the House of Lords (Hereditary Peers) Act 2026
