= Pollock Castle =

Tower house in East Renfrewshire, Scotland

Coordinates: 55°46′57.4″N 4°21′20.2″W

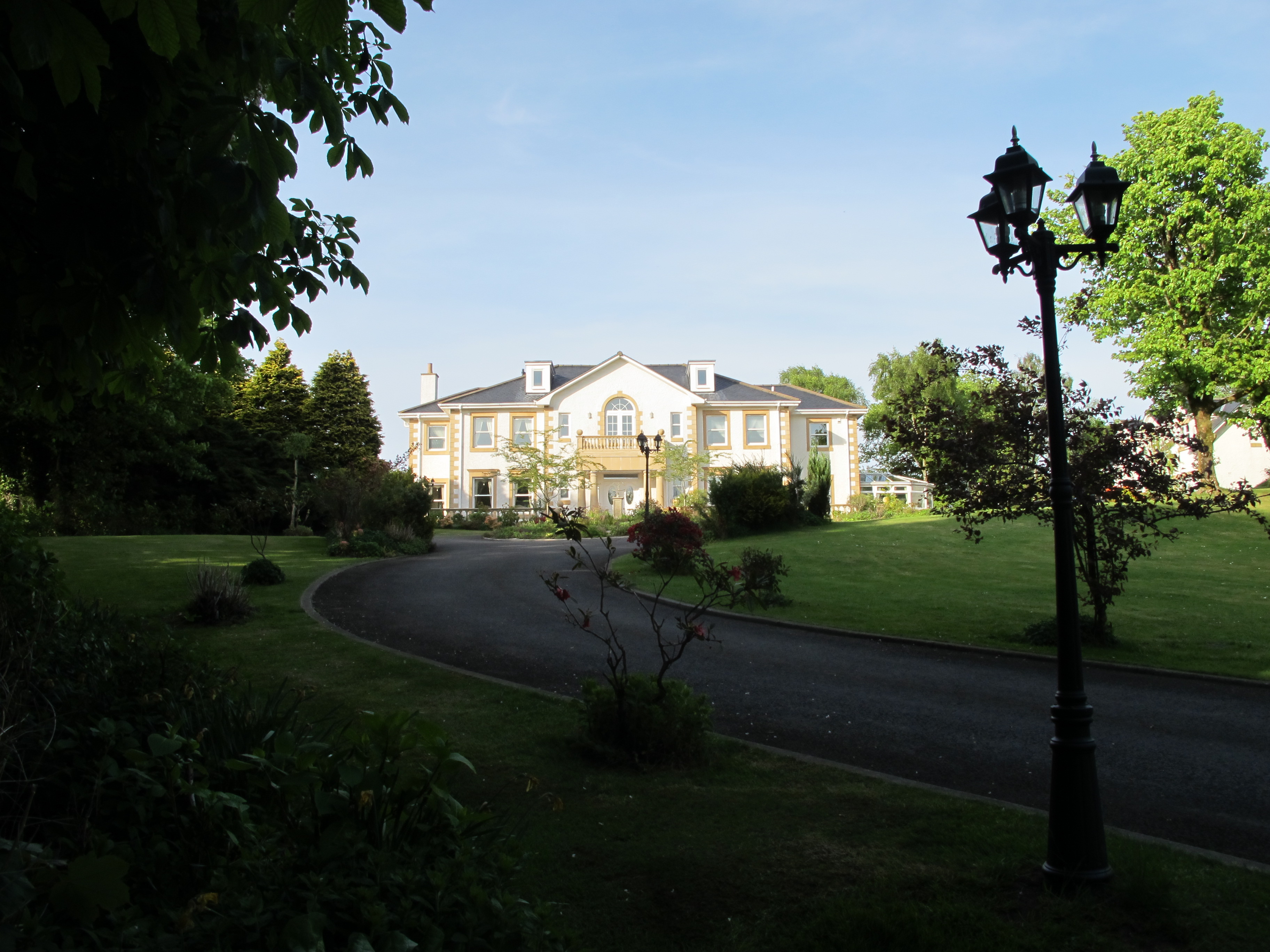
The current "Pollok Castle", built 2003

Pollock Castle, also known as Pollok Castle, was a tower house castle located to the west of modern Newton Mearns in East Renfrewshire, on the opposite side of the M77 motorway from the town. The castle appears on Timothy Pont's map (1583–1596), as a castle named Pook and also appears on Joan Blaeu's map of 1654.

The castle was rebuilt between 1686 and 1694 by Sir Robert Pollok, 1st Baronet of Pollok, with a new east wing. Further extensions included an enclosing courtyard with an ornate gateway and formal walled garden with corner pavilions. William Roy's map (1747–1755) shows the castle and landscape in detail.

It was destroyed by fire in 1882, but rebuilt afterwards in 1886 in the Scots Baronial Style architecture, incorporating the surviving elements of the earlier structure. It was requisitioned by the British Army in 1939 during World War II, bar one wing occupied by the Pollok family throughout the war and the lands used as an ammunition dump. In 1944, Miss Fergusson Pollok, the then owner, abandoned the castle and it then deteriorated. It was required to be demolished in 1952.

In 1970, all that remained of the castle were the two gatehouses, the stable, and the gardener's cottage, the castle's stone foundations, the south entrance steps and a few stones that once formed the castle's massive walls.

Some of the ruins were dynamited in the 1970s and a large prefabricated house erected on the castle foundations by Mr Greer, who purchased Pollok Castle Estate from a timber merchant. The gatehouses at each end of the estate were also rebuilt, along with the gardener's house and the castle stables, and sold on as private residences.

The prefabricated house was removed and the site cleared in the early 1990s and the castle was again rebuilt in 2003, in the Scottish Adam style. Some of the original foundations and castle walls remain, on which the house has been built; notably a portion of the five-metre-high (16 ft) north wall still remains.
