= Sir Donald Pollock, 1st Baronet =

Scottish physician, industrialist, and philanthropist

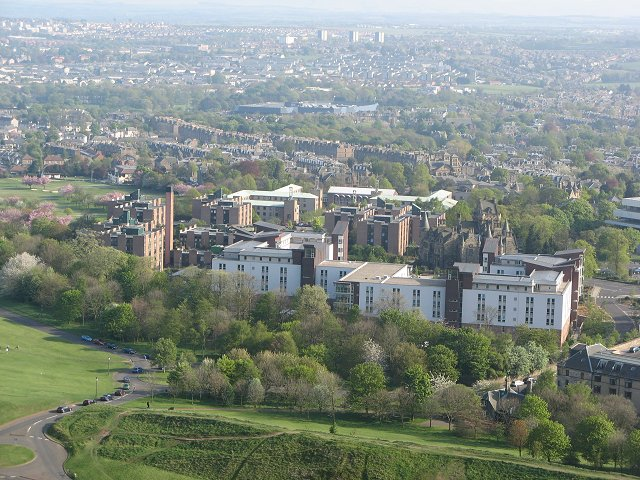
Pollock Halls of Residence

Sir John Donald Pollock, 1st Baronet FRSE LLD (23 November 1868 – 4 June 1962) was a Scottish physician, industrialist and philanthropist who served as Rector of the University of Edinburgh from 1939 to 1945 and gave land to the university to build halls of residence. Pollock Halls of Residence were built on the site, and were named for him.

== Life ==
He was born in Galashiels on 23 November 1868 the son of Margaret (née Donald) and Rev John Barr Pollock.

He studied science at the University of Glasgow then transferred to the University of Edinburgh to study medicine, graduating with an MB Chb in 1892 and gaining his MD in 1895. He then worked as a general practitioner in South Kensington. From 1908 he became the personal physician and companion to the Maurice FitzGerald, 6th Duke of Leinster, who lived in his own personal villa at the asylum at Craig House in Edinburgh. This role continued until the Duke's death in 1922.

His service to the Duke was partially interrupted by the First World War during which he served as a Medical Officer attached to the Royal Navy Reserve.

He then moved into industry, in 1922 becoming a Partner in Metal Industries Ltd and in 1932 taking on an additional role at the British Oxygen Company. He also provided funds to found the company "Turbulayr". In 1937 he was elected a Fellow of the Royal Society of Edinburgh. His proposers were Sir D'Arcy Wentworth Thompson, Sir Thomas Henry Holland, James Pickering Kendall and Sir Edmund Taylor Whittaker.

In the Second World War he was an Honorary Colonel in the Royal Army Ordnance Corps and also an Honorary Wing Commander in the Royal Air Force. On 2 February 1939 he was created a baronet, of Edinburgh in the County of Midlothian.

Pollock was Rector of the University of Edinburgh from 1939 to 1945 and gifted the site which now holds the student accommodation known as Pollock Halls of Residence.

From 1943 to 1961 Pollock was an active members of the ruling council of the Cockburn Association, Edinburgh's influential long-running conservation organisation, serving first as its convener from 1943 to 1954 and then as its vice-president from 1955 to 1961.

He died on 4 June 1962 at Manor House, a large villa on Boswall Road in the Trinity district of Edinburgh, with panoramas overlooking the Firth of Forth. He was unmarried and had no children; his title died with him.

== Artistic recognition ==
His portrait, dressed as Rector, was painted by Stanley Cursiter and is held by the University of Edinburgh.

== See also ==
- Pollock baronets

Academic offices
| Preceded by Herbert John Clifford Grierson | Rector of the University of Edinburgh; 1939–1945 | Succeeded by Viscount Cunningham of Hyndhope |
Baronetage of the United Kingdom
| New creation | Baronet (of Edinburgh); 1939–1962 | Extinct |
