= Adelaide Lowry Pollock =

American teacher, principal, ornithologist and botanist (1860–1938)

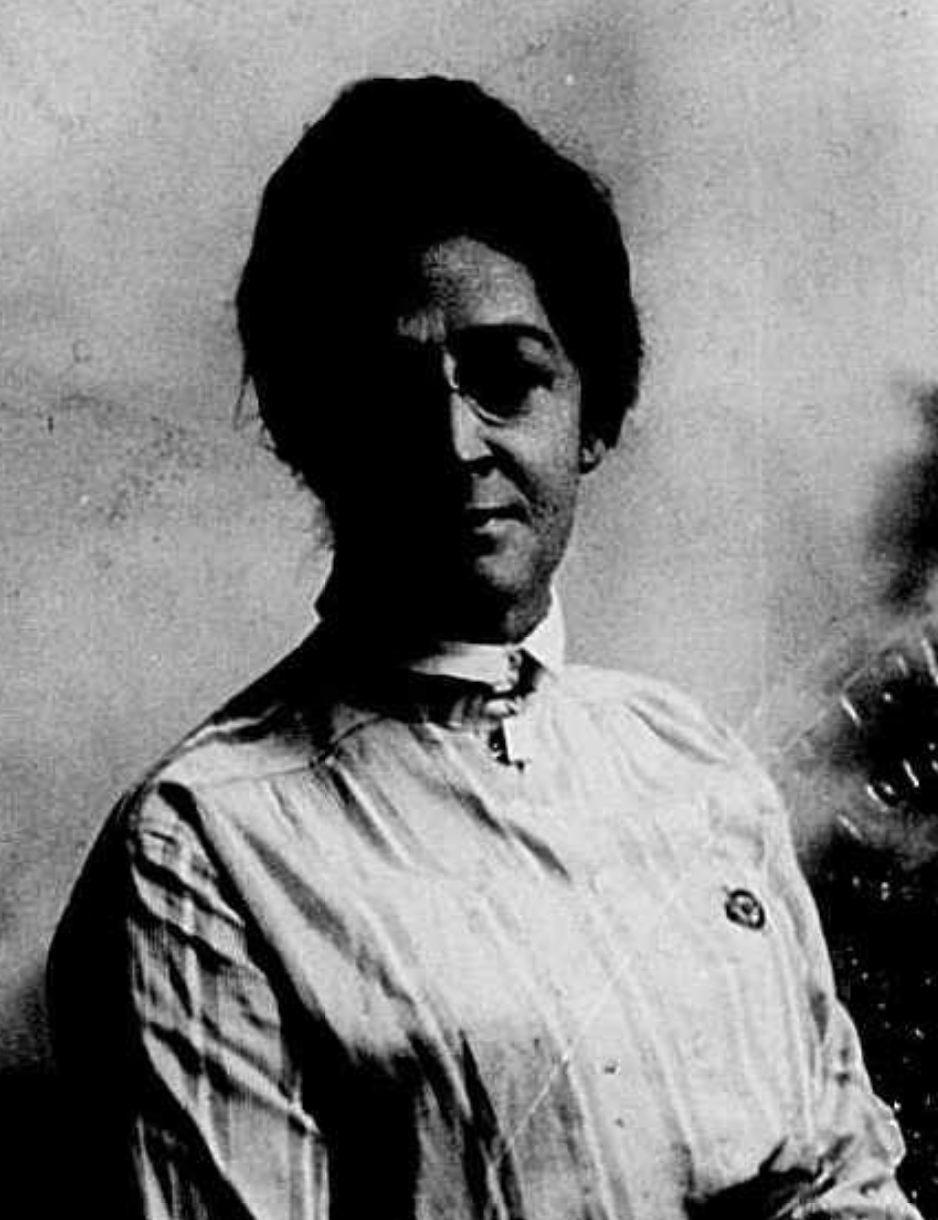

Adelaide Lowry Pollock (14 March 1860 – 3 May 1938) was an American school teacher, principal and community activist in Seattle. She was also an ornithologist and outdoor educator.

Pollock was born in Cedar Rapids, Iowa. The family moved to Oregon in a wagon train in 1864. She studied in San Jose Normal School (1888) and graduated AB (Physiology) Phi Beta Kappa from Leland Stanford University in 1901. She later received an MA from the University of Washington. She was a student at Hopkins Seaside Laboratory for several years. She worked in Stockton California as the first woman principal in 1895. She taught at the one-room Queen Anne school in Seattle where she included nature study in the curriculum. School children learned basket weaving and building bird-houses as part of their studies. In 1818 she volunteered in Europe in the Red Cross. She also worked with the education department of the US Army in France. She was a member of the American Association of University Women (AAUW) serving as its president from 1915 to 1917. She founded the National Council of Administrative Women in Education (NCAWE). She gave talks and organized education activities on birdlife. She also wrote books on birdlife. She served as a member of the city planning society and was involved in the committee for the conservation of birds. She helped found the Seattle Audubon Society and was the author of Wings Over Land and Sea (1930). She established a home for retired school teachers at a time when pensions did not exist and when women teachers were mostly spinsters as married women were not admitted into educational employment. She lived in this home until her death. She died from a stroke in 1938 while birdwatching with a friend on Vashon Island.
