= Highgate Literary and Scientific Institution =

Subscription library in London, England

Coordinates: 51°34′13.5″N 0°08′55.3″W

Highgate Literary and Scientific Institution (HLSI)
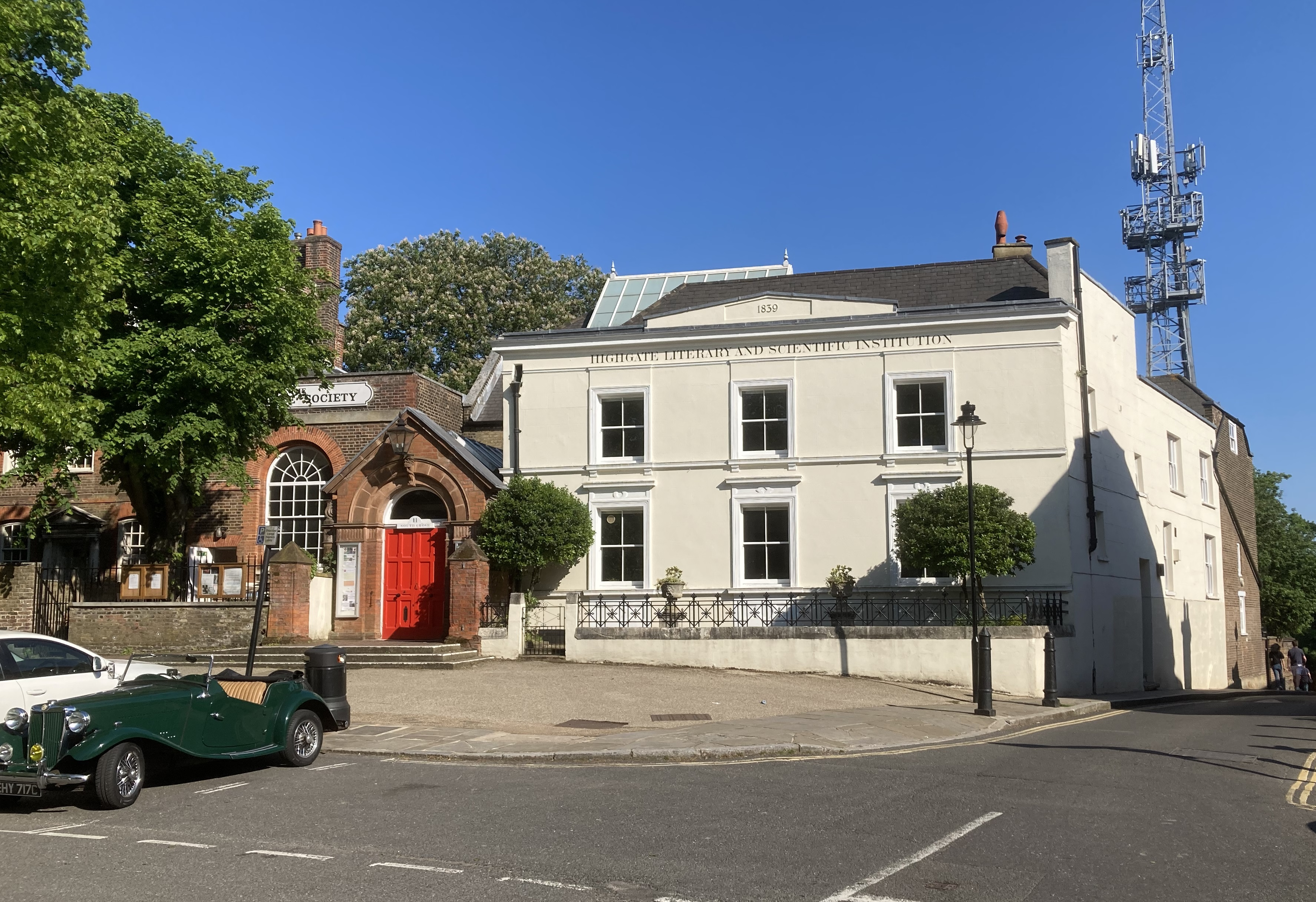
- The HLSI, 11 South Grove, Highgate, N6
- Formation: 1839
- Type: CIO
- Legal status: Charity
- Purpose: To offer opportunities for life-long learning through its courses, library, archives, art gallery, lectures, debates and cultural & social events
- Headquarters: 11 South Grove, Highgate, London, England
- Activities: Courses; Art Gallery; Lectures; Debates; Events
- Collections: Lending Library; Reading Rooms; Archives
- Chair: Hilary Laurie
- Website: https://hlsi.org.uk/

The Highgate Literary and Scientific Institution (HLSI) is a Charitable Company (CIO) Limited by Guarantee. It was founded in 1839 in Highgate, North London, as a friendly society with the aim of helping local people to better understand new developments in industry and discoveries in science. It is now one the few surviving membership supported organisations which predate the widespread establishment of public libraries in the United Kingdom. Today its charitable purpose, from its historic building, is to offer opportunities for life-long learning through its courses, library, archives, art gallery, lectures, debates, cultural and social events.

== Origins ==
The Industrial Revolution of the 18th and 19th centuries set in train a movement for self-improvement among all classes of society. The spirit of enquiry generated by the new scientific inventions and their development in manufacturing processes led to the formation, originally in the big industrial cities of the north, of societies where members could attend lectures and have access to libraries. The first of these, the Manchester Literary and Philosophical Society, founded in 1781, and the Newcastle Literary and Philosophical Society, of 1793, were soon followed by similar organisations all over the country, as well as Mechanics' Institutions whose members included more working men. Libraries and reading rooms were at the heart of even the smallest institutions and to avoid controversy, politics and religion were banned.

By 1839, when the HLSI was founded, the number of all types of institution had risen to nearly 300 and by 1851, the year of the Great Exhibition, the number had more than doubled to almost 700. With little or no division between the two main types the term Literary and Scientific Institution began to be widely used as an alternative to Mechanics' Institutions. The movement reached its peak around the 1860s.

With the Public Libraries Act 1850 many institution libraries were eventually taken over to form the nucleus of the public library system. Further erosion followed the Education Act 1870 and Education Act 1902 and the Technical Instruction Act 1889 meant that the need for some of the Institutions' educational functions had been superseded.

To maintain their membership numbers the remaining societies had to popularise their activities. Systematic science courses gave way to miscellaneous subjects such as popular science, literature, music, history and travel. In their libraries scientific textbooks came to be outnumbered by works of fiction, travel and general literature. Reference rooms were converted into rooms displaying newspapers and periodicals.

The Independent Libraries Association was formed in 1989 by the few remaining UK Institutions still active, including the HLSI, for the exchange of information on questions of mutual interest.

== History of the HLSI ==
Harry Chester was a prominent local resident and Permanent Secretary to the Committee of the Privy Council on Education. On 16 January 1839 he called a meeting at the Gate House Tavern in Highgate Village for the purpose of forming an institution designed to excite and cultivate an intelligent interest in the objects of Literature and Science. It was intended to be for all classes and both sexes. Seventy-six local residents put down their names to become members and at a second meeting two weeks later, on 31 January, the Highgate Literary & Scientific Institution was formed when rules and a constitution were proposed.

In its first set of rules the Institution set out to create and foster a taste for reading and a taste for intellectual pursuits – to bring within reach of Artisan and Mechanic those mental enjoyments which next to the consolations of religion and the blessings of natural affection are the best friends to Virtue and Happiness. To offer books, not only in the rooms of the Institution, but at the firesides of Members and Associates – and lectures to stimulate and gratify an intelligent desire for information. Above all to unite all classes and all parties in one common object – the general good of themselves and all around them.

A search for premises commenced, and after a year in two rented rooms at 1 Southwood Terrace, (now 24 Southwood Lane), the HLSI moved to its present home at 11 South Grove, Highgate Village in 1840.

== Buildings ==
The Institution owns a group of Grade II and II* listed buildings at the top of Swain's Lane in the centre of Highgate Village facing Pond Square. The largest, 11 South Grove is used for the HLSI's own activities, 10a South Grove is leased to the Highgate Society, whilst to the rear in Swain's Lane a cottage and a group of single lock-up garages are also let.

The early history of the buildings on the site is not known for certain, but by the mid-seventeenth century there were three, or perhaps four, cottages disposed round a well. The basement of the HLSI incorporates vaulted cellars typically found in pubs, and it has been speculated that this was the site of the Swan, Highgate's first alehouse dating from the fifteenth century. On the ground occupied by two of the cottages Church House (10 South Grove) was built in 1752 by Peter Storer, brother-in-law of Sir John Hawkins, the friend and biographer of Dr Samuel Johnson. A coach-house and stables were built alongside to the west.

By 1840 Leopold Neumegen was running a school from Church House, on lease from the Hawkins family. Not requiring the coach-house and stables, he sub-let them to the new Institution, becoming no.11 South Grove. At the front, the ground floor was turned into a library and behind, the large coach-house became a lecture hall. In the centre, off a courtyard, was a committee room while upstairs was accommodation for the librarian. In 1851 the Lecture Hall (the present Library) underwent a grand refurbishment incorporating raked seating, a new platform and diagram board provided for the use of lecturers. The Earl of Shaftesbury, the famous philanthropist, was the guest of honour at the re-opening ceremony.

In 1879, forty years after its founding, the Institution embarked on its most ambitious scheme of improvement, designed by the local architect Rawlinson Parkinson. The former Lecture Hall became the Library; the former Library was panelled becoming a reading room; the South Grove frontage was refaced and an entrance porch and lobby were constructed (these were restored in 1988); and the living accommodation was modernised. The following year the open courtyard at the rear was enclosed and roofed becoming the new Lecture Hall, opened by Baroness Burdett-Coutts in March 1880, now called the Victoria Hall. In 2006 the first floor living accommodation was converted into two classrooms (the Gosling and Linden Rooms) and a study/meeting room (The Coleridge Room). A generous legacy from the estate of Livia Gollancz enabled the entire first floor to be extensively renovated in 2025 and an additional meeting room (the Gollancz Room) was created.

The freehold of 11 South Grove was acquired from the Hawkins family in 1932 for £1700 and four years later the Institution bought Church House, 10a and a shop and garage at the back of No. 11 for £2019. Church House was sold in 1957 for £4600 and part of the funds were used to build six lock-up garages on the site of the shop and yard which together with the Institution Cottage and 10a South Grove, have provided a valuable source of rental income for the Institution ever since. 10a South Grove dates from 1848 and in 1919 it became a club for domestic servants, was then briefly used as a studio by Margaret Thomas, R.A. and in 1966 it was leased to the newly-formed Highgate Society.

== The HLSI today ==
Since its foundation in 1839, the Highgate Literary & Scientific Institution has offered a lending library, archive and lectures. Today the activities it offers members and non-members include courses, debates, a science group, opera circle, the Highgate Gallery, a film society, several reading groups and occasional concerts. Only members have use of the Members' Room, Library borrowing rights and reduced rates for classes and activities. The Coleridge and Gollancz Rooms are also available to members for occasional study and research.

The principal rooms in 11 South Grove are also available to hire and regularly host weddings, christening receptions, parties and private concerts.

Courses have developed into an increasingly important activity, in response to greater demand from local retired people, as more studies highlight the health benefits of lifetime learning. Classes are now held throughout the year covering subjects including architecture, art, art history and crafts, exercise, history, languages, music appreciation and walks.

The Library has approximately 25,000 books, ranging from crime fiction to history, reflecting current members’ interests and those of earlier librarians: for example, at various times the Bloomsbury Group, gardening, embroidery, Imperial Russia and women travellers of the 19th century have clearly been much in demand. The early Victorian collection matched the lecture subjects chosen by the members, so was much stronger in the burgeoning fields of science and engineering, but now fiction, biography and history predominate. The children's section holds classics as well as new titles. Many books are not available in other libraries, and the collection is a resource for researchers and writers. In its reference section the HLSI holds special collections on London, Highgate, the explorer Mary Kingsley and the poets Samuel Taylor Coleridge and John Betjeman, all of whom lived in Highgate.

The Archive, which is based in the cellars contains documents and pictures of all kinds relating to Highgate, its environs and its residents since the early seventeenth century. It houses the HLSI's own archive of its activities dating back to its foundation in 1839, as well as material relating to several well-known local residents, including Mary Kingsley, Samuel Taylor Coleridge and John Betjeman, as well as several special collections acquired or given to it over many years. The archive has a large collection of Victorian and 20th Century photographs, including many taken by the highly regarded photographer John Gay. There is a collection of over 600 postcards spanning 100 years of life in Highgate and early 20th century original prints. The HLSI archive also keeps the archives of several local organisations, many now defunct, including the records of the St Pancras Orphanage for Girls, the Southwood Lane Almshouses, the Mothercraft Training Society (which was based at nearby Cromwell House), the Highgate Dispensary, the Mary Feilding Guild, the Highgate Book Society, the Fisher & Sperr bookshop and the Highgate Horticultural Society. It also holds a collection of paintings of Highgate, dating from 1780 to the present day, many of which are displayed around the Institution.

Lectures every Tuesday evening from September to May, on a wide variety of topics, have been a key feature of the Institution's activities since its foundation in 1839. Past lecturers have included (in alphabetical order): Alfred Ainger, Joan Bakewell, Henry Banister, Julian Barnes, Nina Bawden, Michael Berkeley, Adolphus Bernays, Walter Besant, John Betjeman, Samuel Birch, Alfred Blomfield, Anthony Blunt, Ronald Blythe, John Bowring, Simon Brett, Thomas Brimelow, Sophie Bryant, James Buckingham, A. S. Byatt, Hugh Casson, Charles Cowden Clarke, Edward Creasy, William Dalrymple, George Dawson, Charles Dickens Jr., Robert Douglas, Margaret Drabble, Lord Dufferin, Millicent Garrett Fawcett, Roger Fenton, Michael Foot, Antonia Fraser, Michael Frayn, Lord Justice Fry, Samuel Rawson Gardiner, Timothy Garton Ash, Robert Giffen, Misha Glenny, Jane Glover, Isabella Glyn, Edmund Gosse, Philip Henry Gosse, Andrew Graham Dixon, George Grossmith, William Guy, William Harness, Benjamin Waterhouse Hawkins, Simon Hoggart, Richard Holmes (biographer), Richard Rivington Holmes, Michael Holroyd, Edwin Hood, William Huggins, John Hullah, Tristram Hunt, Simon Jenkins, Paul Johnson, Steve Jones, Thomas Rymer Jones, Andrew Jukes, John Scott Keltie, Charles Kemble, Fanny Kemble, Jim Al-Khalili, Mary Kingsley, Edwin Lankester, Hermione Lee, Leone Levi, Penelope Lively, David Lodge, John Lubbock, Richard Mabey, Hilary Mantel, Henry Marsh, Eleanor Marx, Jolyon Maugham, Jonathan Miller, James Morison, Charles Mudie, Frank Muir, James Murray, Julia Neuberger, Paul Nurse, Inglis Palgrave, Michael Palin, William Pengelly, Flinders Petrie, Lady Plowden, Alfred Poland, Jonathon Porritt, Roy Porter, Richard Proctor, Ernest Radford, George Romanes, Michael Rosen, Thomas Rowsell, Mark Rylance, Marcus du Sautoy, Frank Scudamore, William Shedden-Ralston, Walter Skeat, Quentin Skinner, William Spottiswoode, David Starkey, Sergius Stepniak, Edward Stourton, John Summerson, William Symonds, AJP Taylor, Colin Thubron, Claire Tomalin, Lucy Toulmin Smith, Joanna Trollope, Arthur Waley, Fergus Walsh, Marina Warner, Sydney Waterlow, Huw Weldon, Mortimer Wheeler, Mattieu Williams, Lewis Wolpert, John George Wood, Henry Woodward and James Yates.

The Highgate Gallery was founded in 1994 and is housed in the 19th-century vaulted Victoria Hall within the HLSI. It is run by a committee of artists, gallery managers and art collectors which meets every two months to consider new work submitted. It has approximately nine two-week exhibitions each year and periodically a national touring exhibition: David Hockney Grimms' Fairy Tales in 2000, Francisco Goya The Disparates in 2003, Picasso Histoire Naturelle in 2006, Walker Evans photographs in 2010, Georg Grosz The Big No in 2014 and a Kyffin Williams Paper to Palette Knife Centenary Exhibition in 2018.

Other activities in the building include a science group, an opera circle, a film society, craft fairs, concerts, meetings, debates, quizzes and exhibitions.

== Presidents (from 2024, Chairs) ==
- 1839–1858: Harry Chester
- 1858–1866: William Gladstone
- 1866–1867: Rev. John Bradley Dyne
- 1867–1868: Sir William Henry Bodkin
- 1868–1869: Lt. Col. Josiah Wilkinson
- 1869–1870: Sir Sydney Hedley Waterlow
- 1870–1871: W. H. Michael, Q.C.
- 1871–1872: James Brotherton
- 1872–1873: Edward Fry, Q.C.
- 1873–1874: Colonel Leach
- 1874–1876: Benjamin G. Lake
- 1876–1877: Charles Tomlinson
- 1877–1878: William Green
- 1878–1880: Rev. Andrew Jukes, M.A.
- 1880–1884: The Rt. Hon. Lord Justice Fry
- 1884–1886: William Peter Bodkin
- 1886–1887: J. Glover, J.P.
- 1887–1888: Colonel Josiah Wilkinson
- 1888–1890: A. S. Harvey
- 1890–1891: Rev. John Bradley Dyne
- 1891–1892: Arthur Marshall
- 1892–1893: John Sime
- 1893–1895: Dr. Harry Greenwood
- 1895–1896: Abram Lyle
- 1896–1897: Percival Hart
- 1897–1900: Walter Reynolds, J.P.
- 1900–1913: Harry W. Birks
- 1913–1915: James Anderson
- 1915–1919: David Croal Thomson
- 1919–1924: Sir Bignell Elliott
- 1924–1925: W. H. Gillett
- 1925–1928: Dr. A. E. C. Dickinson
- 1928–1930: John Ravenshaw
- 1930–1932: Harold Wade
- 1932–1933: Sir Bignell Elliott
- 1933–1937: Frederick J. Varley
- 1937–1953: Robert Stewart Whipple
- 1953–1973: Sir James Brown
- 1973–1981: Edward Fowler
- 1981–1988: Peter Benton
- 1988–1994: Quentin Edwards
- 1994–1998: David Solomon
- 1998–2002: Laurence Shurman
- 2002–2006: Isabel Raphael
- 2006–2010: Elizabeth Thom
- 2010–2014: Stephen Hodge
- 2014–2018: Catherine Budgett-Meakin
- 2018–2023: Kathy Dallas
- 2023-2026 Simon Edwards
- 2026-present Hilary Laurie

== Bibliography ==
- Crane, Vera (1991), The Heart of a London Village, The Highgate Literary and Scientific Institution, 1839–1990, Historical Publications, ISBN 0-948667-16-8
- Richardson, John (1983), Highgate: Its History since the Fifteenth Century, Eyre and Spottiswoode, ISBN 0-9503656-4-5
- Percy Lovell and William McB. Marcham, ed. (1936), Survey of London, Volume XVII, The Parish of St Pancras Part 1: the Village of Highgate, London County Council
