= Sir Robert Pollock, 1st Baronet =

British member of Parliament (c. 1665 – 1735)

Sir Robert Pollock Bt

Member of Parliament for Renfrewshire
- In office 1710–1722
- Preceded by: Sir John Shaw
- Succeeded by: Thomas Cochrane

Personal details
- Born: c. 1665
- Died: 22 August 1735 (aged 69–70)
- Spouse(s): Annabella Cathcart (m. 1686; died 1691) Annabella Stewart
- Parent(s): Robert Pollock; Jean Crawford

Sir Robert Pollock, 1st Baronet (c. 1665 – 22 August 1735), of Pollok, was a British Army officer and Scottish politician who sat in the Parliament of Scotland from 1700 to 1707 and in the British House of Commons from 1707 to 1722.

== Early life ==
Pollock was the eldest son of Robert Pollock of Pollok and his second wife, Jean Crawford, daughter of Cornelius Crawford of Jordanhill, Renfrewshire. He succeeded his father who died in 1673. He was educated at Glasgow in 1679.

== Career ==
In 1689 Pollock was a lieutenant in an independent troop of horse. He was a captain in the 7th Dragoons by April 1690 and a major of foot in Lord Murray’s regiment from 1694 until 1698 when he went onto half-pay. In 1700 he was elected to the Parliament of Scotland as a Shire Commissioner for Renfrewshire and sat until the Union. He was created baronet on 30 November 1703 and became a major of Dragoons in the Earl of Hyndford’s regiment under the first and second Earl until 1710.

At the Union in 1707 Pollock became a representative of Scotland in the first Great Britain Parliament. He had difficulty finding a seat at the 1708 general election and ended up standing unsuccessfully at Linlithgow Burghs. At the 1710 general election, he was returned unopposed as Member of Parliament for Renfrewshire. Also in 1710 he became a lieutenant-colonel and was a colonel in 1712. He was returned unopposed again at Renfrewshire at the 1713 general election. From 1713 to 1715, he was on Army half-pay. He was appointed Governor of Fort William on 25 February 1715 and was returned again as MP for Renfrewshire at the 1715 general election. He lost his support by 1722 and consequently his seat at the 1722 general election.

== Personal life ==
He married firstly by contract dated 25/30 January 1686, Annabella (née Maxwell) Cathcart, widow of John Cathcart of Carleton, Ayr, and daughter of Sir George Maxwell, of Nether Pollock, Renfrew. She died without issue before 15 May 1691. He married, secondly, Annabella Stewart, daughter of Walter Stewart, of Pardovan, Linlithgow. He completely demolished Pollock Castle and rebuilt it as a large stately house in 1686. He had four sons whom he outlived and three daughters, including:

- Elizabeth Pollock, who married Laird Alexander Hamilton of Grange in 1730.
- Jean Pollock.
- Annabella Pollock.
- Walter Pollock, who became father of the 2nd baronet.

Sir Robert died on 22 August 1735. His second son, Walter, had a son Robert who succeeded by to the baronetcy, but with whose death, in 1783, the baronetcy became extinct.

=== Descendants ===
Through his daughter Elizabeth, he was grandfather of James A. Hamilton (1718–1799) and great-grandfather of Alexander Hamilton, 1st Secretary of the Treasury in the United States.

Parliament of Great Britain
| Preceded by Sir John Shaw | Member of Parliament for Renfrewshire; 1710–1722 | Succeeded by Thomas Cochrane |
Baronetage of Nova Scotia
| New creation | Baronet of Pollock; 1703–1735 | Succeeded by Robert Pollock |
