= Sir William Frederick Pollock, 2nd Baronet =

Sir William Frederick Pollock, 2nd Baronet (13 April 1815 – 24 December 1888) was a British barrister and author. He was Queen's Remembrancer from 1874 to 1886.

== Biography ==
The eldest son of Sir Jonathan Frederick Pollock, 1st Baronet by his first wife, he was educated under private tutors, at St Paul's School, and at Trinity College, Cambridge, where he obtained a scholarship in 1835, graduated BA in 1836, and proceeded MA in 1840. Although of junior standing to Tennyson, he was a member of the little society (the Apostles} whose debates are celebrated in ‘In Memoriam’ (lxxxvi).

Pollock was called to the bar at the Inner Temple on 26 January 1838, and went the Northern Circuit, in which he held for some years the post of revising barrister. He was appointed a master of the Court of Exchequer in 1846, and in 1874 to the ancient office of Queen's Remembrancer. On the fusion of the courts of law and equity in the Supreme Court of Judicature (1875) the office of Queen's Remembrancer was annexed to the senior mastership, and continued to be held by Pollock until September 1886, when he resigned. He died at his residence in Montagu Square, London on 24 December 1888.

Pollock was author of The Divine Comedy; or the Inferno, Purgatory, and Paradise of Dante rendered into English (in closely literal blank verse, with fine plates by Dalziel from drawings by George, afterwards Sir George Scharf, mostly after John Flaxman), London, 1854, 8vo.

Pollock was a man of liberal culture and rare social charm. His entertaining Personal Remembrances, which he published in 1887, show how various were his accomplishments, and how numerous his friendships in the world of letters, science, and art. He was one of William Macready's executors, and edited his Reminiscences.

His portrait was painted by W. W. Ouless, R.A. in 1873. It used to hang in the The Equitable Life Assurance Society, of which he was President from 1875 to 1888. He was vice-president of the Literary Fund, honorary secretary to the Society of Dilettanti, and for many years was a manager of the Royal Institution.

== Family ==
Pollock married, on 30 March 1844, Juliet, daughter of the Rev. Henry Creed, vicar of Corse, Gloucestershire; of his three sons, the eldest, Sir Frederick Pollock, 3rd Baronet, was Corpus Professor of Jurisprudence at Oxford (1883–1903). His second son was the writer Walter Herries Pollock, and the third was George Frederick Pollock.
