= Charles Nelson Pogue =

Canadian inventor (1897–1985)

Charles Nelson Pogue (15 September 1897 – 1985) was a Canadian mechanic and inventor who in the 1930s filed a series of US patents for a miracle carburetor (sometimes called the Winnipeg carburetor) that would allegedly enable a car to attain 200 miles per US gallon (1.2 L/100 km; 240 mpg_{‑imp}); it was described as a vaporising carburetor or sometimes a catalytic carburetor. But the 1936 (possibly 1932) announcement was not followed by any verifiable tests or demonstrations.

== Description ==
The carburetor is described in several publicly available patents which have now expired, and there is no evidence that the patents were ever suppressed or that the rights were bought up by the oil industry, the motor industry, or the government. The patents included: U.S. patent 1,750,354, U.S. patent 1,938,497, U.S. patent 1,997,497 & U.S. patent 2,026,798.

A recent (2003) version of the story from Cornwall, England, has the original blueprints supposedly turning up in a secret compartment in a retired mechanic's toolbox. The story claims that the Toronto Stock Exchange "was rocked" in the 1930s (although no date or year is given), and that Pogue was given a job as manager of a factory (unnamed) making oil filters for the motor industry.

== See also ==
- Fuel saving device#Urban legend
