= Pollock baronets =

Baronetcy in the Baronetage of the United Kingdom

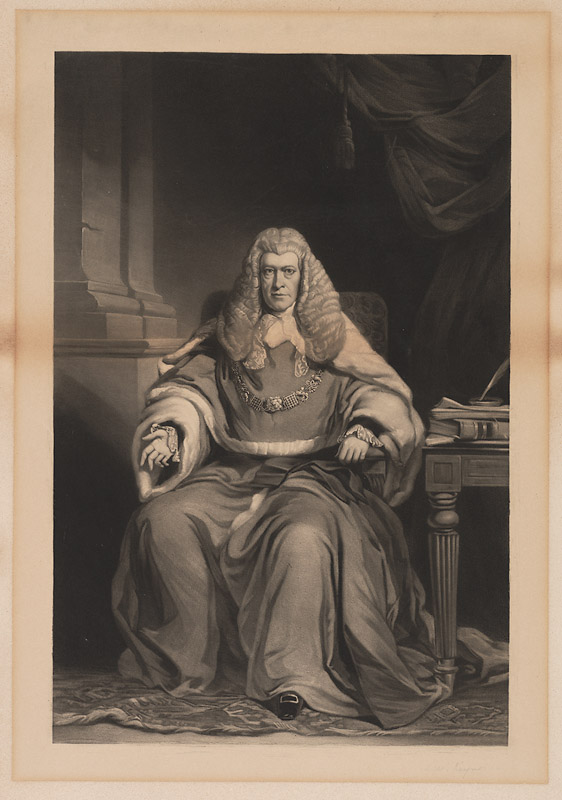
Sir Frederick Pollock, 1st Baronet

There have been five baronetcies created for people with the surname Pollock, one in the Baronetage of Nova Scotia and four in the Baronetage of the United Kingdom. As of 2017 three of the creations are extant. These three creations derive from the same family to which the 1703 baronetcy was granted; the Pollock ancestor of Sir Frederick Pollock, 1st Baronet, and Sir George Pollock, 1st Baronet (both sons of the saddler David Pollock, of Charing Cross), married his cousin, daughter of Sir Robert Pollock, 2nd Baronet.

The Pollock baronetcy, of Pollock, was created in the Baronetage of Nova Scotia on 30 November 1703 for Robert Pollock. This creation became extinct in 1783 on the death of the second Baronet.

The Pollock baronetcy, of Hatton in the County of Middlesex, was created in the Baronetage of the United Kingdom on 2 August 1866 for the lawyer Frederick Pollock, Lord Chief Baron of the Exchequer between 1844 and 1868. He was the elder brother of the first Baronet of the 1872 creation and the grandfather of the first Baronet of the 1922 creation.

The Pollock baronetcy, of The Khyber Pass in India, was created in the Baronetage of the United Kingdom on 26 March 1872 for the soldier George Pollock. He was the younger brother of the first Baronet of the 1866 creation and the great-uncle of the first Baronet of the 1922 creation. The 2nd Baronet assumed the additional name and arms of Montagu by Royal Licence 11 August 1873.

The Pollock baronetcy, of Hanworth in the County of Middlesex, was created in the Baronetage of the United Kingdom on 27 November 1922 for the lawyer, judge and Conservative politician Ernest Pollock. He was the grandson of the first Baronet of the 1866 creation and the great-nephew of the first Baronet of the 1872 creation. Pollock was later elevated to the peerage as Viscount Hanworth. For more information, see this title.

The Pollock baronetcy, of Edinburgh in the County of Midlothian, was created in the Baronetage of the United Kingdom on 2 February 1939 for John Donald Pollock. This creation became extinct on his death in 1962.

== Pollock baronets, of Pollock (1703) ==
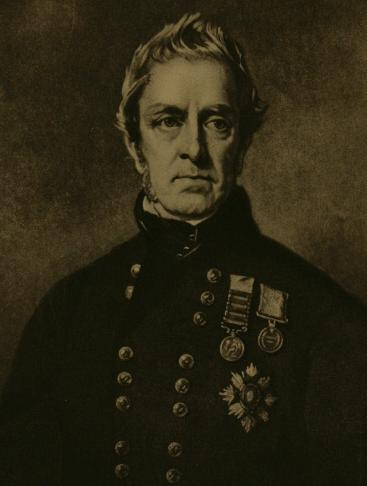
Sir George Pollock, 1st Baronet

- Sir Robert Pollock, 1st Baronet (c. 1665–1735)
- Sir Robert Pollock, 2nd Baronet (died 1783)

== Pollock baronets, of Hatton (1866) ==
Escutcheon of the Pollock baronets of Hatton

- Sir Frederick Pollock, 1st Baronet (1783–1870)
- Sir William Frederick Pollock, 2nd Baronet (1815–1888)
- Sir Frederick Pollock, 3rd Baronet (1845–1937)
- Sir Frederick John Pollock, 4th Baronet (1878–1963)
- Sir George Frederick Pollock, 5th Baronet (1928–2016)
- Sir David Frederick Pollock, 6th Baronet (born 1959)

The heir presumptive is Julian Rivers Pollock (born 1942), a kinsman of the present holder.

== Pollock (now Montagu-Pollock) baronets, of The Khyber Pass (1872) ==
- Field Marshal Sir George Pollock, GCB, GCSI, 1st Baronet (1786–1872)
- Sir Frederick Montagu-Pollock, 2nd Baronet (1815–1874)
- Sir Montagu Frederick Montagu-Pollock, 3rd Baronet (1864–1938)
- Sir George Seymour Montagu-Pollock, 4th Baronet (1900–1985)
- Sir Giles Hampden Montagu-Pollock, 5th Baronet (1928–2017)
- Sir Guy Maximilian Montagu-Pollock, 6th Baronet (born 1966)

The heir presumptive is Jonathan David Montagu-Pollock (born 1947), a kinsman of the present holder.

== Pollock baronets, of Hanworth (1922) ==
- see Viscount Hanworth

== Pollock baronets, of Edinburgh (1939) ==
- Sir (John) Donald Pollock, 1st Baronet (1868–1962)
