= Ernest Pollock, 1st Viscount Hanworth =

British politician, lawyer and judge

The Right Honourable The Viscount Hanworth KBE PC
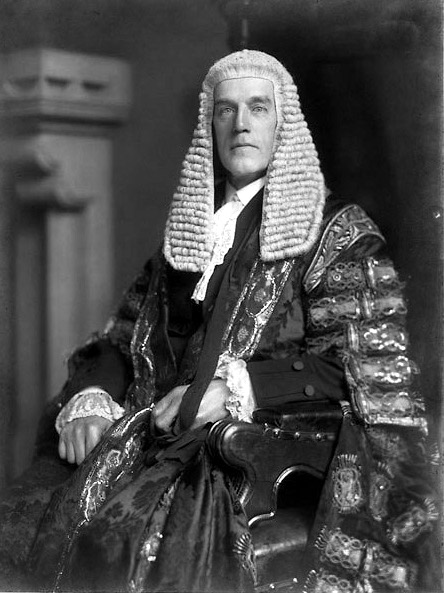

Solicitor General for England and Wales
- In office 10 January 1919 – 6 March 1922
- Monarch: George V
- Preceded by: Sir Gorden Hewart
- Succeeded by: Sir Leslie Scott

Master of the Rolls
- In office 11 October 1923 – 7 October 1935
- Monarch: George V
- Preceded by: The Lord Sterndale
- Succeeded by: The Lord Wright

Member of Parliament for Warwick and Leamington
- In office 10 February 1910 – 6 December 1923
- Preceded by: Thomas Berridge
- Succeeded by: Anthony Eden

Member of the House of Lords
- Lord Temporal
- In office 2 February 1926 – 22 October 1936
- Preceded by: Peerage created
- Succeeded by: The 2nd Viscount Hanworth

Personal details
- Born: Ernest Murray Pollock; 25 November 1861 Wimbledon, London
- Died: 22 October 1936 (aged 74) Hythe, Kent
- Citizenship: British
- Spouse: Laura Helen Salt
- Education: Charterhouse School
- Alma mater: Trinity College, Cambridge
- Other titles: 1st Baron Hanworth; 1st Baronet

Ernest Murray Pollock, 1st Viscount Hanworth (25 November 1861 – 22 October 1936), was a British Conservative politician, lawyer and judge. He served as Master of the Rolls from 1923 to 1935.

== Background ==
Pollock was born in Wimbledon, London, the fifth son of George Frederick Pollock, grandson of Sir Frederick Pollock, 1st Baronet, Lord Chief Baron of the Court of Exchequer. He was educated at Charterhouse School and Trinity College, Cambridge, graduating in 1883. He was called to the bar by the Inner Temple in 1885.

== Political and legal career ==
Pollock sat as Member of Parliament for Warwick and Leamington from 1910 to 1923. In 1919, under David Lloyd George, he was appointed Solicitor General which he remained until 1922, when he became Attorney General, but left this post the same year. He was appointed to the Privy Council in the 1922 New Year Honours and was created a baronet later the same year. He left the House of Commons at the 1923 general election, and was replaced in his seat by Anthony Eden. The same year he was made Master of the Rolls. On 28 January 1926 he elevated to the peerage as Baron Hanworth, of Hanworth in the County of Middlesex. He resigned as Master of the Rolls in 1935. The following year he was further honoured when he was made Viscount Hanworth, of Hanworth in the County of Middlesex, on 17 January 1936.

== Family ==
Lord Hanworth married Laura Helen Salt (1865–1954), daughter of banker and politician Thomas Salt, in 1887. They had a son and daughter, Marjorie Laura, who married (Sir) Walter Leslie Farrer, solicitor to George VI. He died at his home in Hythe, Kent, in October 1936, aged 74. He was succeeded in the viscountcy by his grandson David Pollock, 2nd Viscount Hanworth, his son Charles Thomas Anderdon Pollock (d. 1918) having been killed in the First World War.

== Arms ==
Coat of arms of Ernest Pollock, 1st Viscount Hanworth
Crest A Boar passant quarterly Or and Vert pierced through the sinister shoulder with an Arrow proper Escutcheon Azure three Fleurs-de-lis within a Bordure engrailed Or on a Chief Ermine two Portcullises of the second Supporters On either side a Bear Or muzzled collared and chained Sable Motto Audacter Et Strenue (Boldly and strenuously)

== Footnotes ==
Parliament of the United Kingdom
Preceded by Thomas Berridge	Member of Parliament for Warwick and Leamington; January 1910 – 1923	Succeeded by Anthony Eden
Legal offices
Preceded by Gordon Hewart	Solicitor General for England and Wales; 1919–1922	Succeeded by Leslie Scott
Preceded by Gordon Hewart	Attorney General for England and Wales; 1922	Succeeded by Douglas Hogg
Preceded by Lord Sterndale	Master of the Rolls; 1923–1935	Succeeded by Lord Wright
Peerage of the United Kingdom
New creation	Viscount Hanworth; 1936	Succeeded by David Pollock
New creation	Baron Hanworth; 1926–1936; Member of the House of Lords (1926–1936)	Succeeded by David Pollock
Baronetage of the United Kingdom
New creation	Baronet of Hanworth; 1922–1936	Succeeded by David Pollock
