= Swain's Lane =

Street in Highgate, London

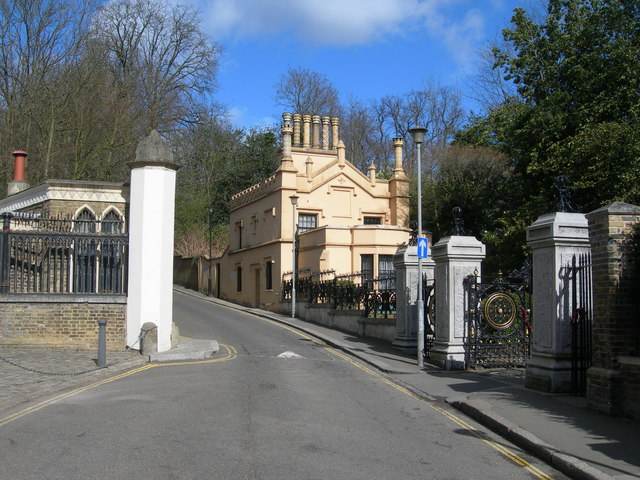
Swain's Lane Lodge at the entrance to Waterlow Park.

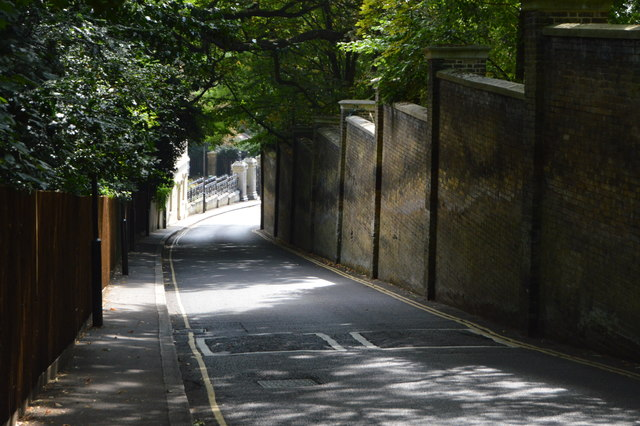
Downhill view looking southwards

Swain's Lane is a street in Highgate in the London Borough of Camden. It runs up Highgate Hill, for much of its route alongside Highgate Cemetery and Waterlow Park. It is noted for its steepness. It runs uphill from a junction with Highgate Road and Highgate West Hill close to Hampstead Heath. Its northern end terminates on South Grove close to Pond Square in the heart of old Highgate village.

It is first mentioned in 1481 as providing access to nearby fields in the then rural area outside the capital. The first recorded habitation was in 1609 and by 1801 it featured a dozen cottages known as Swaine's Row. Highgate Cemetery was established in 1839. To the west of the Lane the garden suburb of Holly Lodge Estate was developed in the interwar era. A number of buildings in the street are now listed.

== Bibliography ==
- Bebbington, Gillian. London Street Names. Batsford, 1972.
- Cherry, Bridget & Pevsner, Nikolaus. London 4: North. Yale University Press, 2002.
- Denford, Steven & Hayes, David A. Streets of Highgate. Camden History Society, 2007.
