= Person (disambiguation) =

A person is a being, such as a human, that has certain capacities or attributes constituting personhood.

Person or Persons may also refer to:

- Dramatis personae, the characters in a play or other written work
- Persona, a social role, or a character played by an actor
- Person (grammar), person as a grammatical category
- Person (law), person as a legal category
- Person (Catholic canon law), person as a category in Catholic canon law
- Person (theology), person as a theological category
- Human, person as a human individual
- Person (surname)
- Persons (surname)
- Person Colby Cheney (1828–1901), American paper manufacturer, abolitionist, and politician
- Person County, North Carolina, U.S.

== See also ==
- Personal (disambiguation)
