= The Gatehouse, Highgate =

Pub in Highgate, London

Coordinates: 51.5714°N 0.1501°W

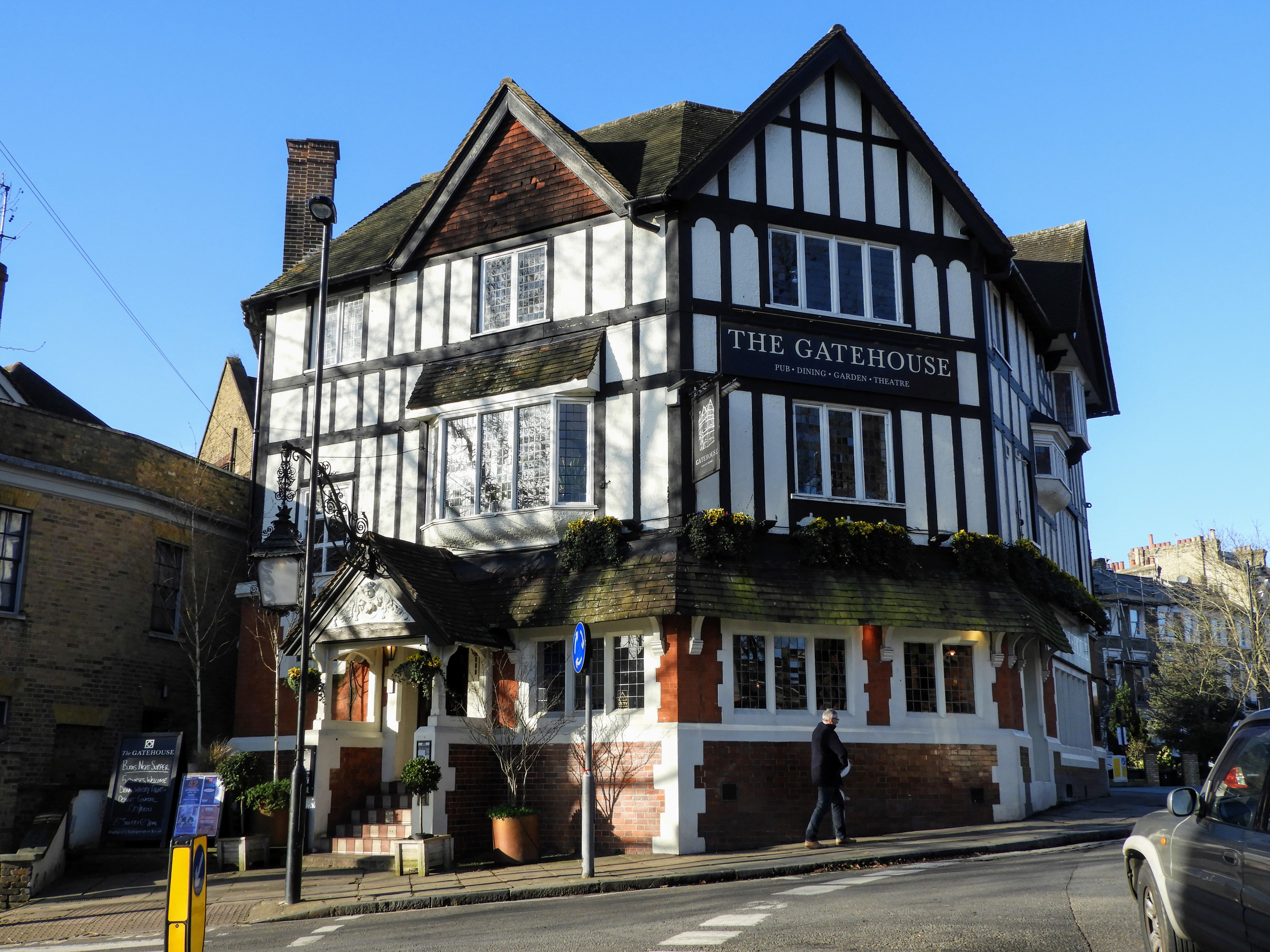
Exterior of the pub in 2020.

The Gatehouse is a public house in Highgate, London, located at a road junction where Highgate High Street, West Hill, North Hill and Hampstead Lane converge close to Pond Square. It stands on the site of the oldest recorded structure in Highgate Village. A toll road was constructed in the early fourteenth century and an arched gateway was constructed under which all passing had to pay. This gave its name to the area.

It was one of five taverns recorded in Highgate in 1552 It became associated with the tradition of Swearing on the Horns for travellers passing through when it was one of the principal approach roads leading to London. However, business suffered with the construction of Archway Road by Thomas Telford and John Nash's Archway Bridge across it in 1813 which meant that much of the traffic now bypassed Highgate.

It was subsequently rebuilt in mock Tudor style. From 1993 to 2015 it was part of the Wetherspoons chain. It features a theatre above the pub known as Upstairs at the Gatehouse.

== See also ==
- The Flask, Highgate, a nearby pub
- Prince of Wales, Highgate, a nearby pub

== Bibliography ==
- Bebbington, Gillian. London Street Names. Batsford, 1972.
- Cherry, Bridget & Pevsner, Nikolaus. London 4: North. Yale University Press, 2002.
- Denford, Steven & Hayes, David A. Streets of Highgate. Camden History Society, 2007.
- McMurdo, Lucy. Hampstead & Highgate in 50 Buildings. Amberley Publishing Limited, 2022.
