= Highgate West Hill =

Street in Highgate, London

Coordinates: 51.5662°N 0.1535°W

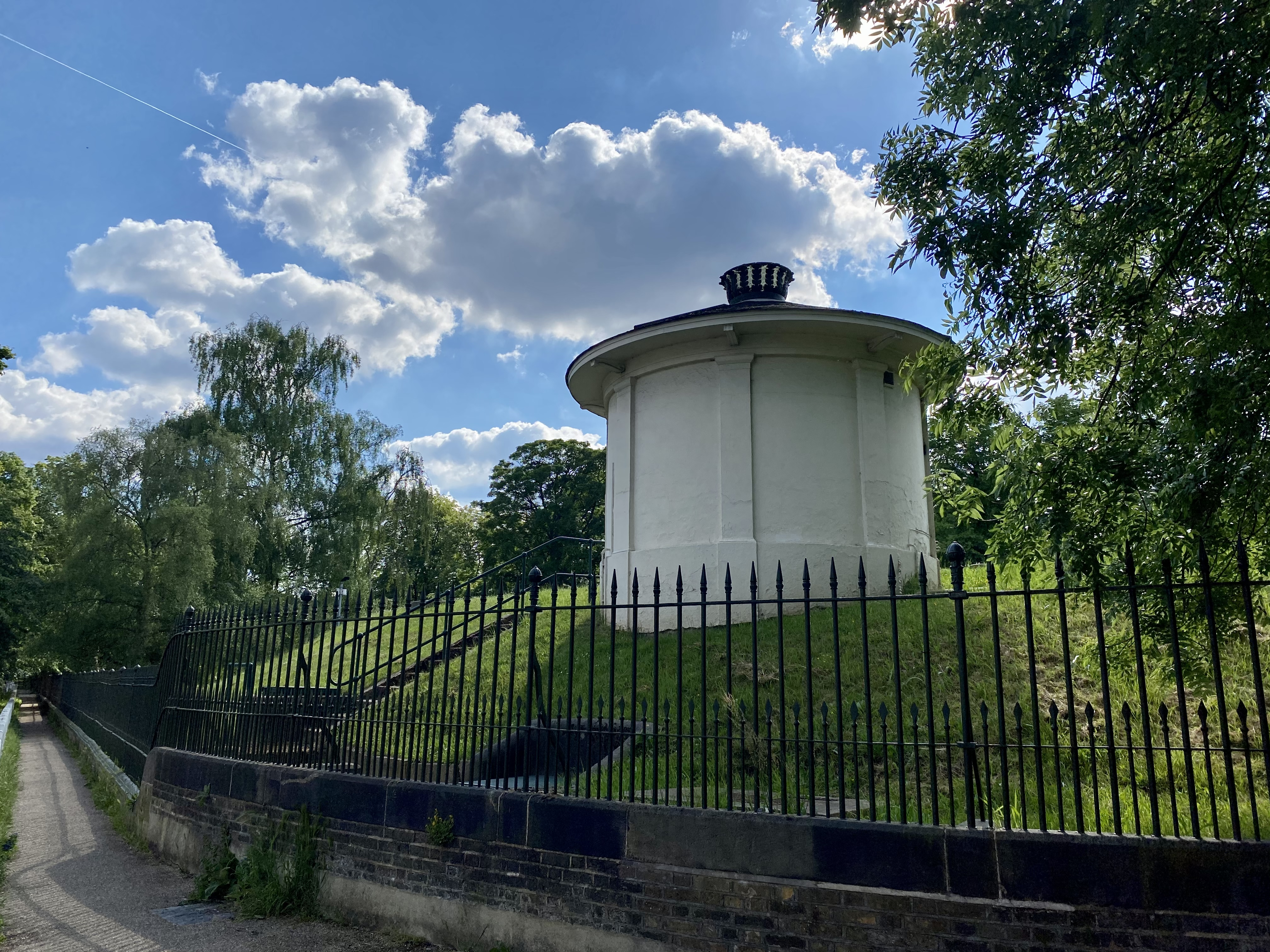
Highgate Reservoir, dating back to 1845.

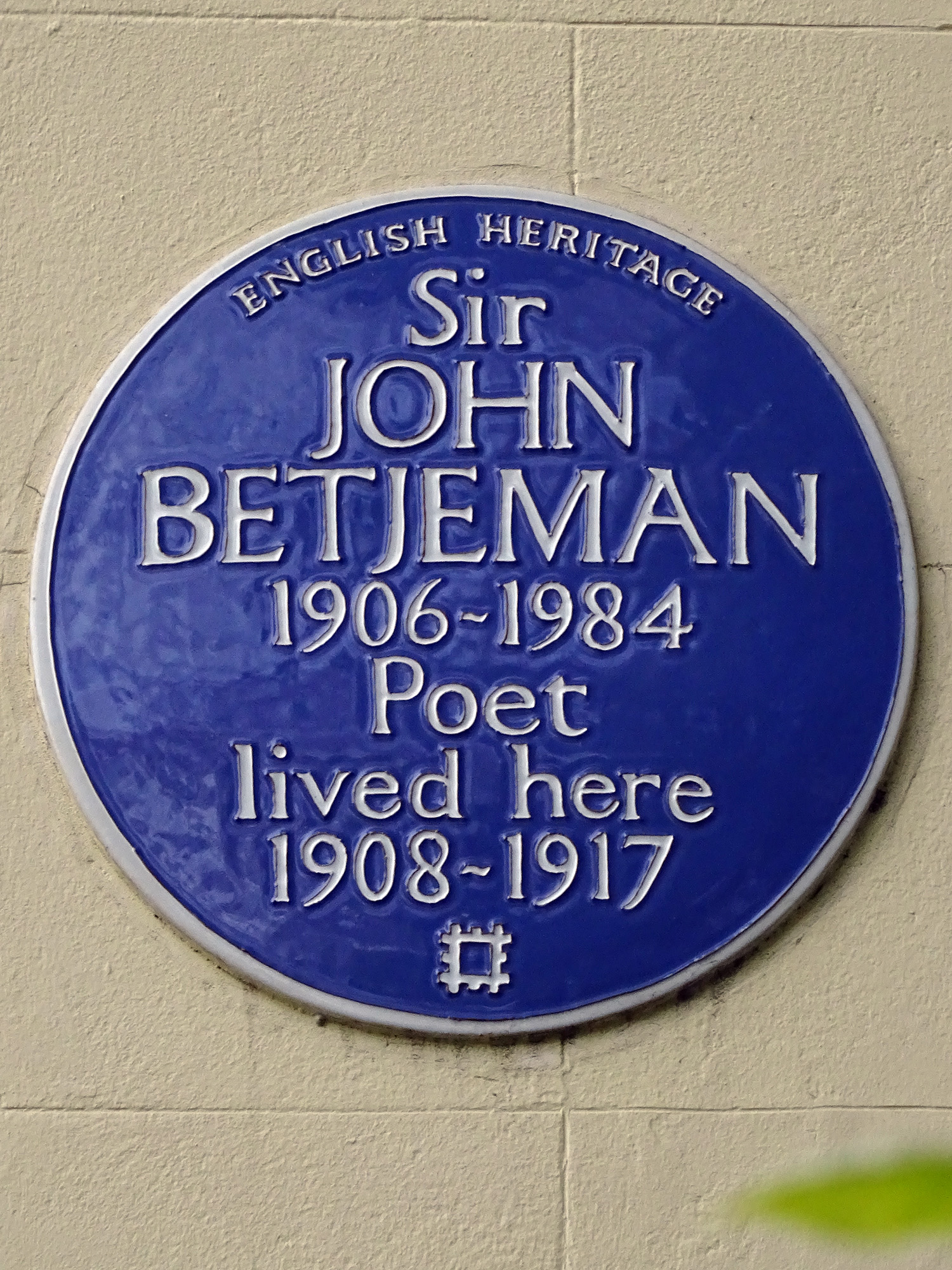
Blue Plaque on the former residence of John Betjeman

Highgate West Hill is a street in Highgate, London. Located in the London Borough of Camden it runs north to south with Hampstead Heath off to its west and Highgate Cemetery away to the east. A number of streets run off the road including The Grove, Millfield Lane and Hillway. The route dates back to the medieval era.

At the northern end is crossroads with North Road, Hampstead Lane and Highgate High Street, close to Pond Square. At the southern end it becomes Highgate Road at a junction with Swain's Lane. Highgate Road continues south into Kentish Town. Its name distinguishes it from Highgate Hill the street that approaches the settlement of Highgate from the east. It is also sometimes written as West Hill, Highgate

For centuries The Gatehouse pub at the northern end of the street marked the boundary between parishes of Hornsey and St Pancras. Today it marks the border between the boroughs of Camden and Haringey. Buildings on the northern section of the road are on land taken from the old Highgate Green in the eighteenth century. To the west is Highgate Reservoir, also constructed on land taken from the old green, with a pavilion dating back to 1845. The Flask pub is located at the junction with South Grove and has existed on the spot since the seventeenth century.

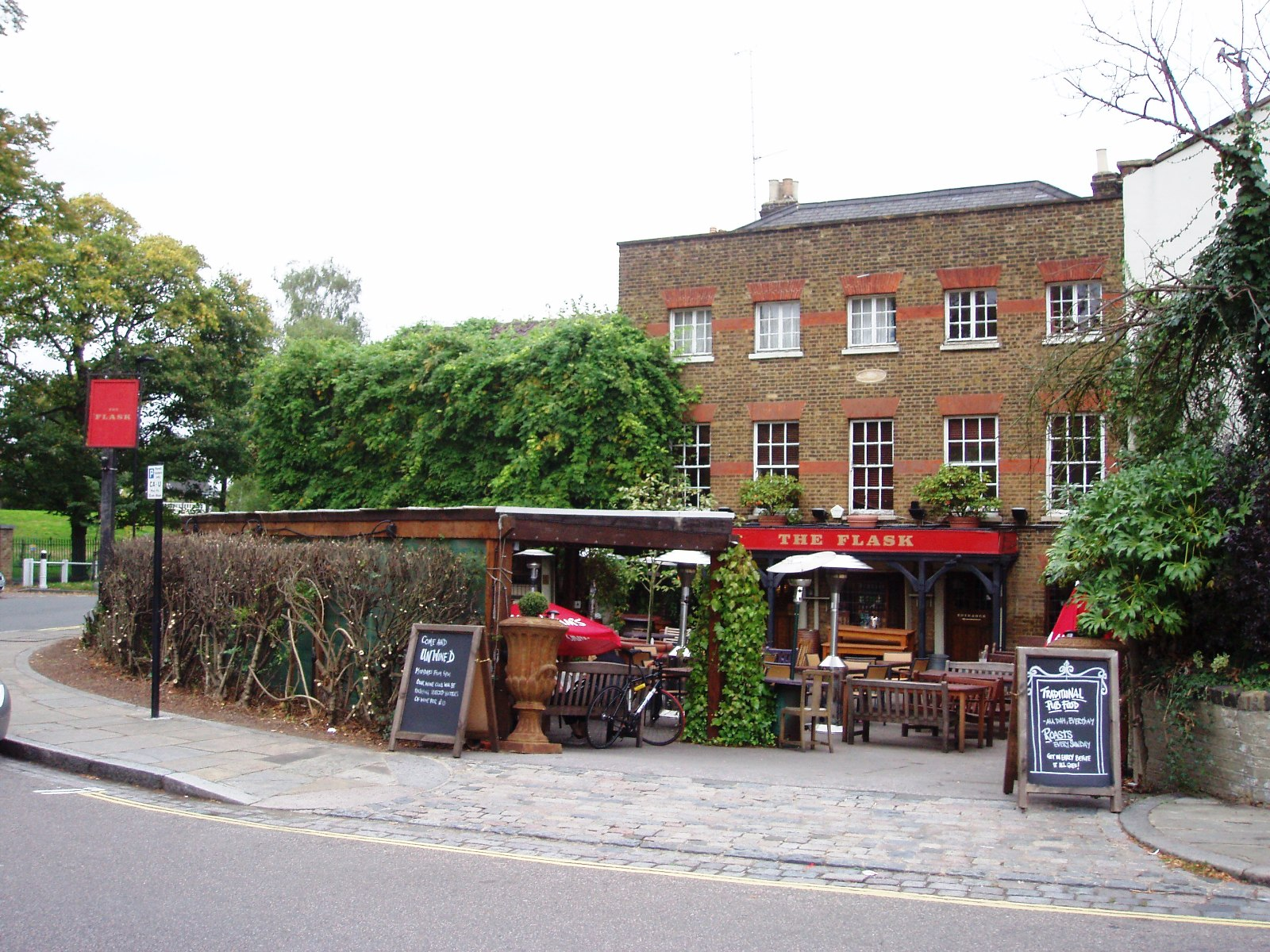
The Flask pub.

A junction by the Duke of St Albans pub marks the southern end of the street. Swain's Lane runs east off it before heading northwards up a steep approach to Highgate. West Hill features a number of listed buildings.

== Bibliography ==
- Bebbington, Gillian. London Street Names. Batsford, 1972.
- Cherry, Bridget & Pevsner, Nikolaus. London 4: North. Yale University Press, 2002.
- Denford, Steven & Hayes, David A. Streets of Highgate. Camden History Society, 2007.
