= Pehrson =

Pehrson is a surname. Notable people with the surname include:

- Ingeborg Pehrson (1886–1950), Danish stage and film actress
- Jeff Pehrson (born 1967), American singer-songwriter
- Johan Pehrson (born 1968), Swedish politician
- Joseph Pehrson (1950–2020), American composer and pianist
- Robert Didrik Pehrson (1872–1965), Norwegian Nordic skier

== See also ==
- Pearson (surname)
- Peerson
- Persson
