= Persson =

Persson (also Person, Pärsson) is the eighth most common Swedish family name. It is a patronymic surname and literally means "son of Per".

== People with the surname ==
- Åke Persson, Swedish jazz trombonist
- Berta Persson (1893–1961), first woman bus driver in Sweden.
- Erling Persson, founder of Swedish clothing company H&M
- Essy Persson, Swedish actress
- Göran Persson, Swedish politician and former Prime Minister (1996–2006)
- Håkan Persson, Swedish 3D-Artist
- Halvor Persson (born 1966), Norwegian ski jumper
- Joakim Persson (footballer, born 1975), Swedish footballer
- Joakim Persson (footballer, born 2002), Swedish footballer
- Johanna Persson, Swedish female badminton player
- Jöran Persson, counsellor to King Erik XIV of Sweden
- Jörgen Persson, Swedish table tennis player
- Karl-Johan Persson, billionaire CEO and president of Swedish company H&M
- Kristin Persson, Swedish physicist and chemist
- Kristina Persson (born 1945), Swedish politician
- Leif G. W. Persson, Swedish criminologist and writer
- Marie Persson (born 1967), Swedish curler
- Markus Persson (born 1979), Swedish video game developer
- Mia Persson (born 1990), Swedish footballer
- Miah Persson, Swedish soprano
- Michael Persson (born 1959), Swedish weightlifter
- Nahid Persson, Swedish director
- Nina Persson, Swedish pop singer
- Örjan Persson, retired Swedish footballer
- Peter Persson (born 1955), Swedish politician
- Ricard Persson (born 1969), Swedish ice hockey player
- Rickard Persson (born 1959), Swedish politician
- Sara Persson, Swedish female badminton player
- Set Persson, Swedish communist politician
- Stefan Persson (fashion magnate) (born 1947), billionaire owner of Swedish company H&M
- Stefan Persson (ice hockey) (born 1954), Swedish ice hockey player
- Stieg Persson, Australian artist
- Sven Yngve Persson (born 1960), Swedish politician
- Tom Persson, billionaire hier to H&M fortune and filmmaker
- Torsten Persson, Swedish economist
- Ulrica Persson, Swedish cross-country skier

== Fictional characters ==
- Una Persson, a recurring character in many of Michael Moorcock's 'Multiverse' novels.

== Other variations ==
- Dale-Elizabeth Pehrsson, American academic administrator
- Magnus Pehrsson, retired Swedish footballer
- Robert Pehrsson, Swedish musician
- Cristina Husmark Pehrsson, Swedish politician
- Axel Pehrsson-Bramstorp, former Prime Minister of Sweden
- Anja Pärson (born 1981), Swedish Olympic skier

== See also ==
- Persson Motorsport, German racing team competing in the Deutsche Tourenwagen Masters
- Peerson
- Pehrson
- Person (surname)
