= Person (surname) =

Person is a surname. Notable people with the surname include:

- Andrzej Person (born 1951), Polish politician
- Chad Person (born 1978), American contemporary artist
- Charles Person (1942–2025), African-American civil rights activist
- Chuck Person (born 1964), National Basketball Association (NBA) assistant coach and former player
- Curtis S. Person Jr. (1934–2020), American politician from Tennessee
- Houston Person (born 1934), American jazz saxophonist
- Jay Person (born 2000), American football player
- Leroy Person (1907–1985), American sculptor, Outsider Artist
- Luis Sérgio Person (1936–1976), Brazilian filmmaker
- Marina Person (born 1969), Brazilian actress, filmmaker and former MTV VJ
- Mike Person (born 1988), American professional football player
- Owen Person (1888–1976), American politician from Nebraska
- Ricky Person Jr. (born 1999), American football player
- Robert Person (born 1969), former Major League Baseball pitcher
- Ruth J. Person, American university administrator
- Seymour H. Person (1879–1957), American politician from Michigan
- Steven Person, American politician
- Thomas Person (1733–1800), American politician
- Waverly Person (1926–2022), American seismologist
- Wesley Person (born 1971), former NBA player

== See also ==
- Persons (surname)
- Persson
- Willie Person Mangum (1792–1861), American politician
- Earl Old Person (1929–2021), Native American (Blackfoot) politician
