= Prince of Wales, Highgate =

Pub in Highgate, London

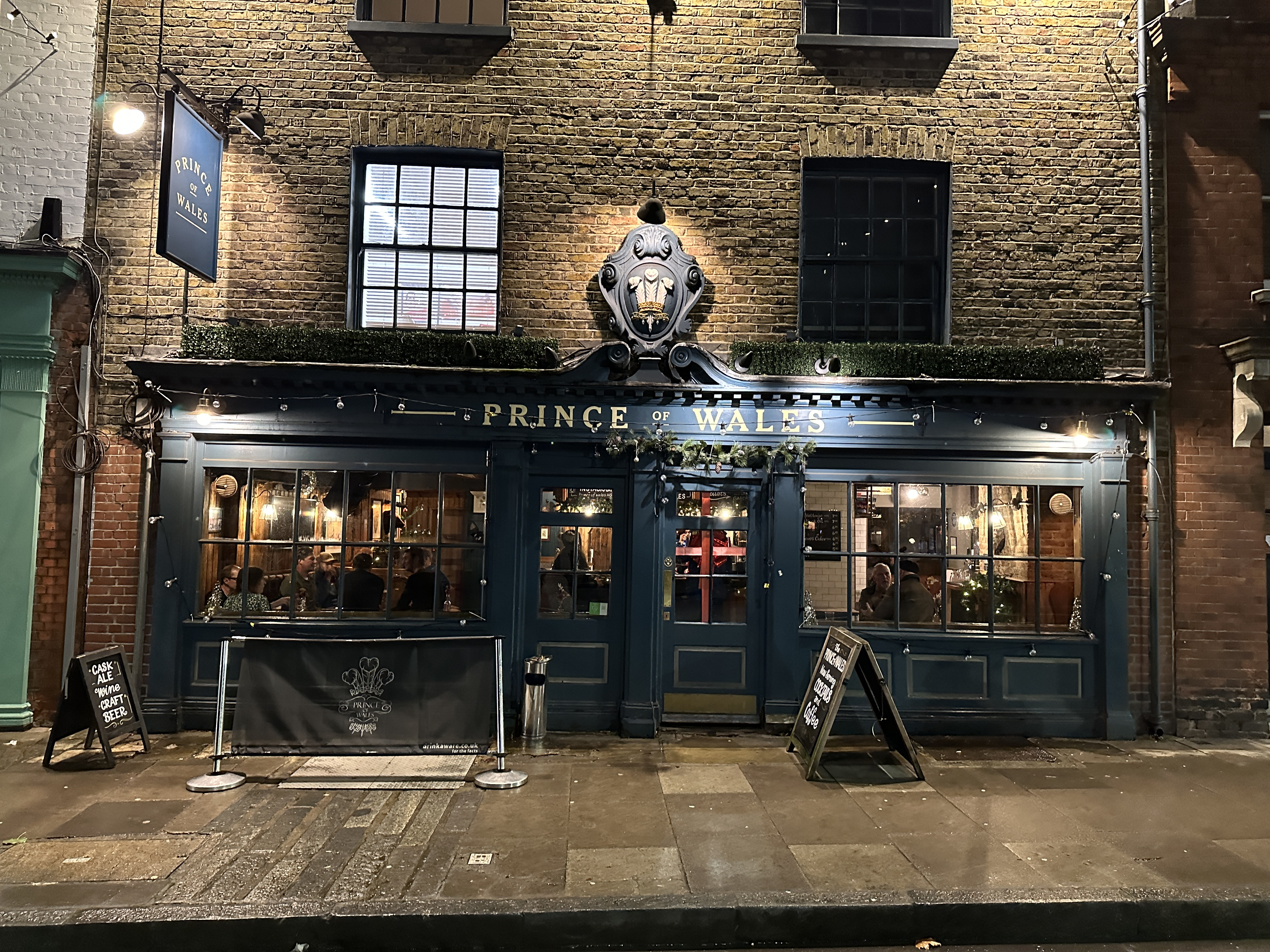
The Prince of Wales in 2023.

The Prince of Wales is a Grade II listed public house in Highgate, London. Located on Highgate High Street, the building dates back to the eighteenth century. It became a pub in 1864 when the future Edward VII held the title of Prince of Wales. Amongst former landlords was the retired sportsman Leslie Compton who played cricket for Middlesex and football for Arsenal. The rear of the pub faces on to Pond Square. The pub and neighbouring buildings have been listed since 1974.

== See also ==
- The Gatehouse, Highgate, a nearby pub

== Bibliography ==
- Bard, Robert. Hampstead & Highgate Through Time. Amberley Publishing Limited, 2015.
- Clark, Leonard. Prospect of Highgate and Hampstead. Highgate Press, 1967.
- Denford, Steven & Hayes, David A. Streets of Highgate. Camden History Society, 2007.
- Rippon, Anton. Arsenal: The Story of a Football Club in 101 Lives. White Owl, 2020.
