= A Private Entertainment of the King and Queen on May-Day =

1604 masque by Ben Jonson

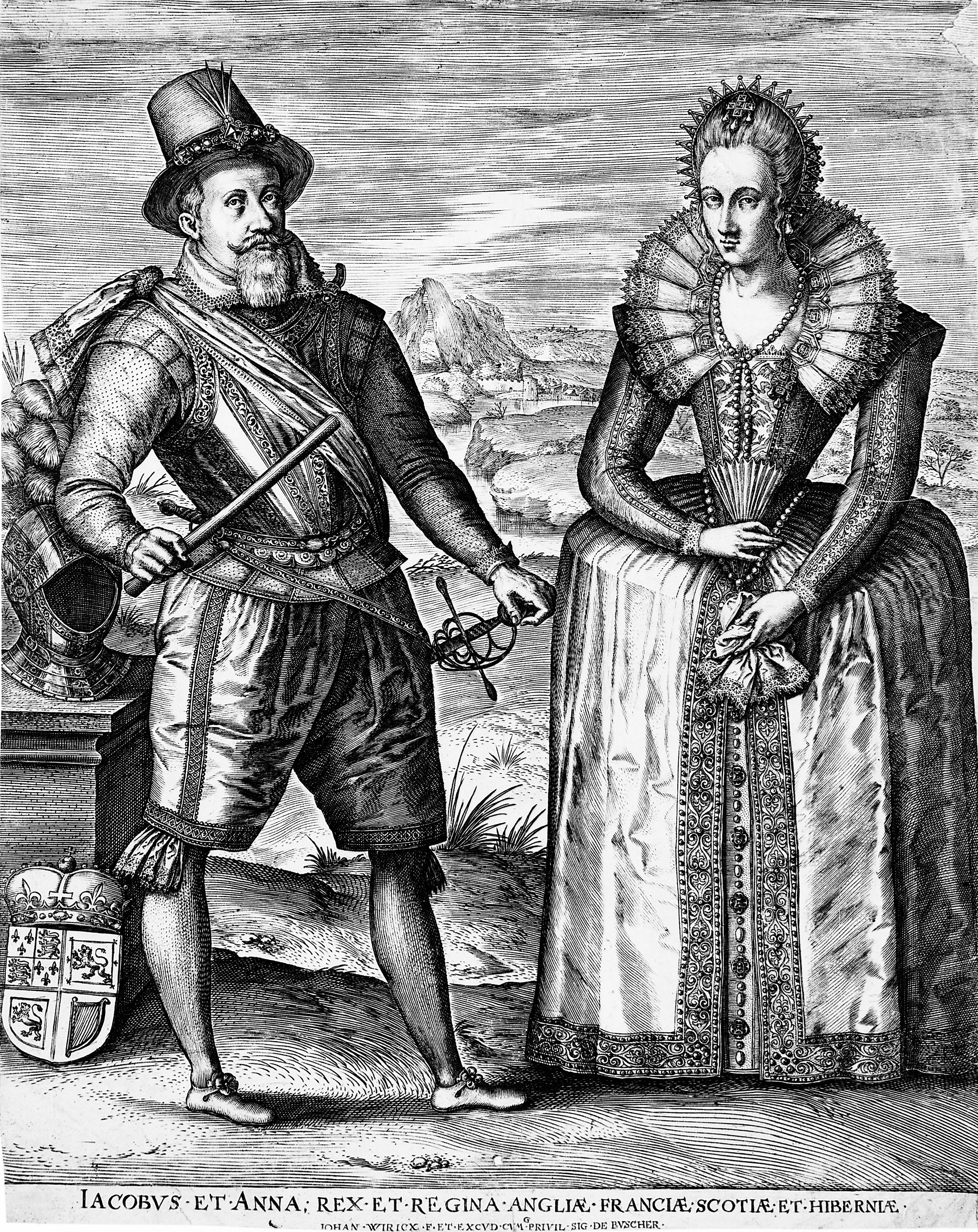
James VI and I and Anne of Denmark were May guests at Highgate in 1604

A Private Entertainment of the King and Queen on May-Day, also known as the Penates, was a masque by Ben Jonson performed on 1 May 1604 at the house of Sir William Cornwallis in Highgate. It also called the Highgate Entertainment'.

== Summary ==
James VI and I and Anne of Denmark were met at the gate of Cornwallis's house by the Penates or household gods. The house was blest by their "double majesty". They walked through the house into the garden to meet Mercury, and hear the song of Aurora, Zephyrus, and Flora, See, see, O see who here is come a Maying! May herself was presented in her bower.

After dinner, there was a dialogue between Mercury and Pan in the garden. Pan handed out drinks from a fountain of wine.

== Song ==
The song from the masque, See, see, O see who is here come a-maying!, appears in Martin Peerson's Private Music, or the First Book of Airs and Dialogues (1620):

See, see, O see who here is come a-maying!
The master of the ocean;
And his beauteous Orian:
Why left we our playing?
To gaze, to gaze,
On them, that gods no less than men amaze.
Up, nightingale, and sing
Jug, jug, Jug, jug, etc.
Raise, lark, thy note, and wing,
All birds their music bring,
Sweet robin, linet, thrush,
Record from every bush
The welcome of the king;
And queen.

Elizabeth I had been celebrated as "Oriana" and Anne of Denmark was welcomed at Althorp in 1603 as Oriana. Peerson was briefly a proprietor and shareholder of a theatre company, the "Children of the Queen's Revels". The masque directly alludes to the reputation of Danish people as enthusiastic drinkers and may include references to the custom of "Swearing on the Horns". William Cornwallis continued his close connection with the Stuart court by marrying Jane Meautys, a lady in waiting to the queen.

== The garden ==
The view of London and the countryside from Cornwallis's house was praised by John Norden. In the Entertainment, Mercury describes the view from a mount, an ornamental mound, in the garden:

Here, for her month, the yearly delicate May keeps state; and from this mount takes pleasure to display these valleys, yonder lesser hills, those statelier edifices and towers, that seem enamoured so far off, and are reared on end to behold her, as if their utmost object were her beauties. Hither the Dryads of the valley, and nymphs of the great river come every morning to taste of her favours; and depart away with laps filled with her bounties.

Subsequently, the Highgate house was a residence of Alethea Howard, Countess of Arundel. In 1612, the English diplomat in the Netherlands, William Trumbull sent trees for her garden in Highgate, shipped from Vlissingen.
