= Highgate High Street =

Street in Highgate, London

Coordinates: 51.5707°N 0.1474°W

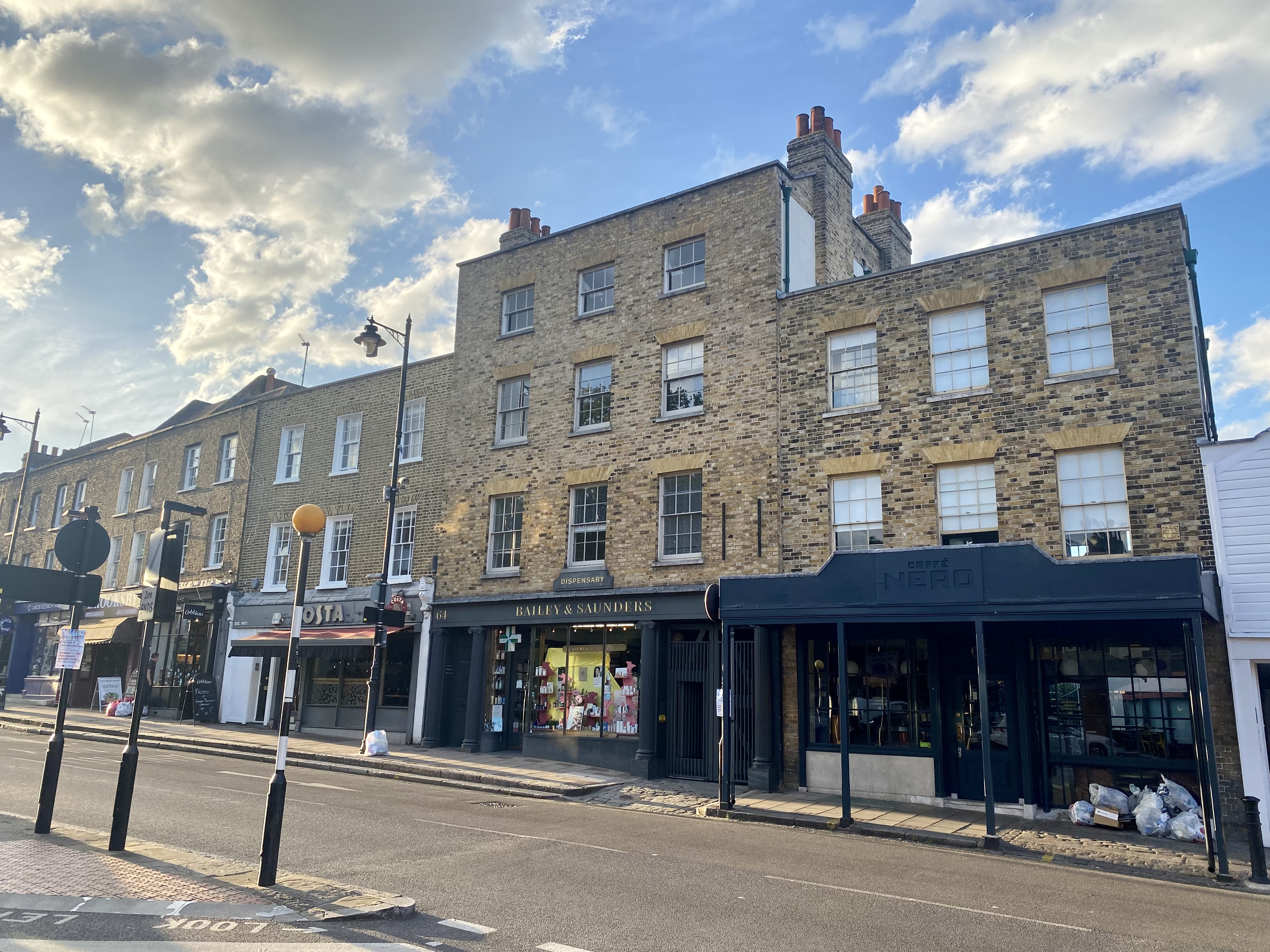
62-66 Highgate High Street

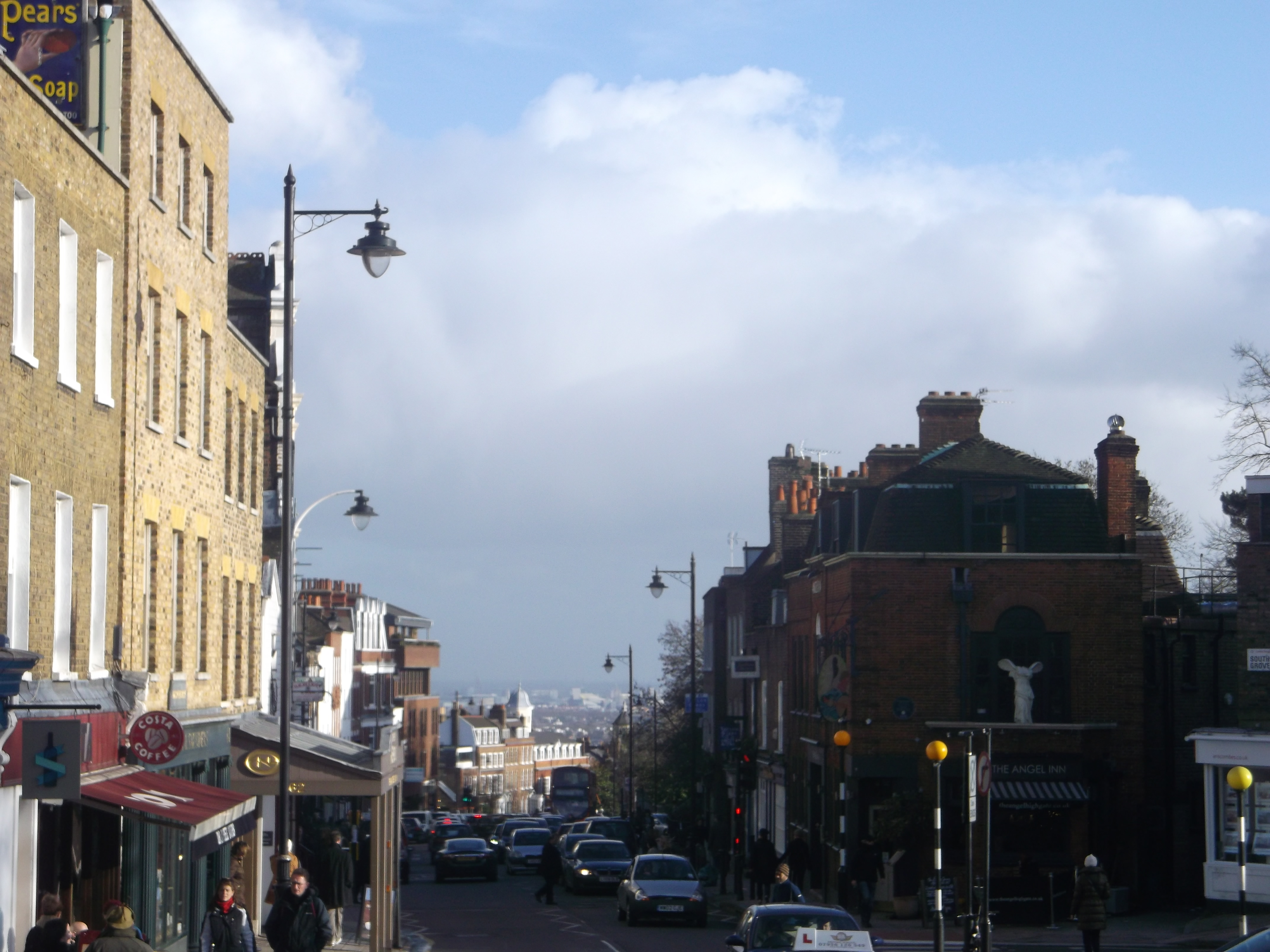
View down Highgate Hill from the High Street. The Angel Inn is on the right.

Highgate High Street is located in Highgate in London. A high street, it provides the main shopping thoroughfare for the settlement at the top of Highgate Hill. It runs downhill from the western end and forms of the longer B519 that includes Highgate Hill towards Archway. At its western end is a crossroads by The Gatehouse pub where it meets Hampstead Lane, Highgate West Hill and North Road. Pond Square, the village green of Highgate, is located nearby. Other roads running off the High Street include Southwood Lane and South Grove. The High Street forms the border between the London Borough of Camden to the south and Haringey to the north, reflecting the historic parish boundaries between Hornsey and St Pancras.

Highgate developed as a hamlet in the early fourteenth century by the arched gateway on a north–south toll road that gave the settlement its name. The high street didn't take on its recognisable, current layout until the Tudor era. By the Georgian era it had grown into a small town. Most of the present buildings date from the seventeenth to nineteenth centuries. It features several pubs including The Gatehouse, the Prince of Wales and The Angel Inn. This is part of its legacy as an old coaching town before the settlement was bypassed by the new Archway Road in the 1810s. A number of the buildings are now listed.

== Bibliography ==
- Bebbington, Gillian. London Street Names. Batsford, 1972.
- Cherry, Bridget & Pevsner, Nikolaus. London 4: North. Yale University Press, 2002.
- Denford, Steven & Hayes, David A. Streets of Highgate. Camden History Society, 2007.
