= Waterlow Park =

Park in Highgate, London, England

Coordinates: 51.569°N 0.145°W

View of the City of London from Waterlow Park.

Waterlow Park is a 26-acre (11 ha) park in the southeast of Highgate Village, in north London. It was given to the public (i.e. the London County Council) by Sir Sydney Waterlow, as "a garden for the gardenless" in 1889. It is located to the west of Swain's Lane.

== Description ==
The park is set on a 29-acre (12 ha) site on a hillside south of Highgate Hill. It is named after the Lord Mayor of London, Sir Sydney Waterlow.

The site offers views across the City of London. It has three ponds all fed by natural springs.

== History ==
The land has been laid out as gardens since the seventeenth century and contains many mature trees.

Lauderdale House sits at the edge of the park. It was built around 1580 and subsequently owned by the Dukes of Lauderdale. It is now used as a tea room and for functions and arts events and is surrounded by formal gardens. The original timber-framed structure has been extensively modified from its original sixteenth century construction, and none of the interior remains in its original state. It was the home of Earl (later Duke) of Lauderdale in the 17th century. There is a local tradition that Nell Gwyn, the mistress of King Charles II lived there at a later date.

The poet Andrew Marvell lived in another nearby house which was once within the bounds of the park. One of his poems is displayed on a bronze plaque in the park. Another house once within the park was the home of the architect Sir James Pennethorne.

The park was leased by Waterlow to St Bartholomew's Hospital in 1872 to use as a home for recovering patients, and remained the case until 1883. In 1889, Waterlow donated the park to the London County Council, with the intention that it would be a "garden for the garden-less". Lauderdale House was restored at the same time. In 1963, a fire broke out, leaving the building and surrounding structures derelict. The park suffered years of neglect and vandalism but was restored with a grant from the Heritage Lottery Fund in 2001. It reopened in 2005 and is now managed by the London Borough of Camden.

== Features ==
A bronze statue of Sir Sidney Waterlow is located in the park. It was constructed by Frank Taubamn, and shows Waterlow holding a hat, umbrella and key, the latter of which symbolises his donation of the land to public property. There is also an abstract art piece, Image, designed by Naomi Blake and installed in 1979.

== Cultural references ==
The park was referenced by Ian Hunter of Mott the Hoople in their song "Waterlow", from the 1971 album "Wildlife".
