= Upstairs at the Gatehouse =

Off West End theatre in Highgate, London

Coordinates: 51.5714°N 0.1501°W

Upstairs at The Gatehouse
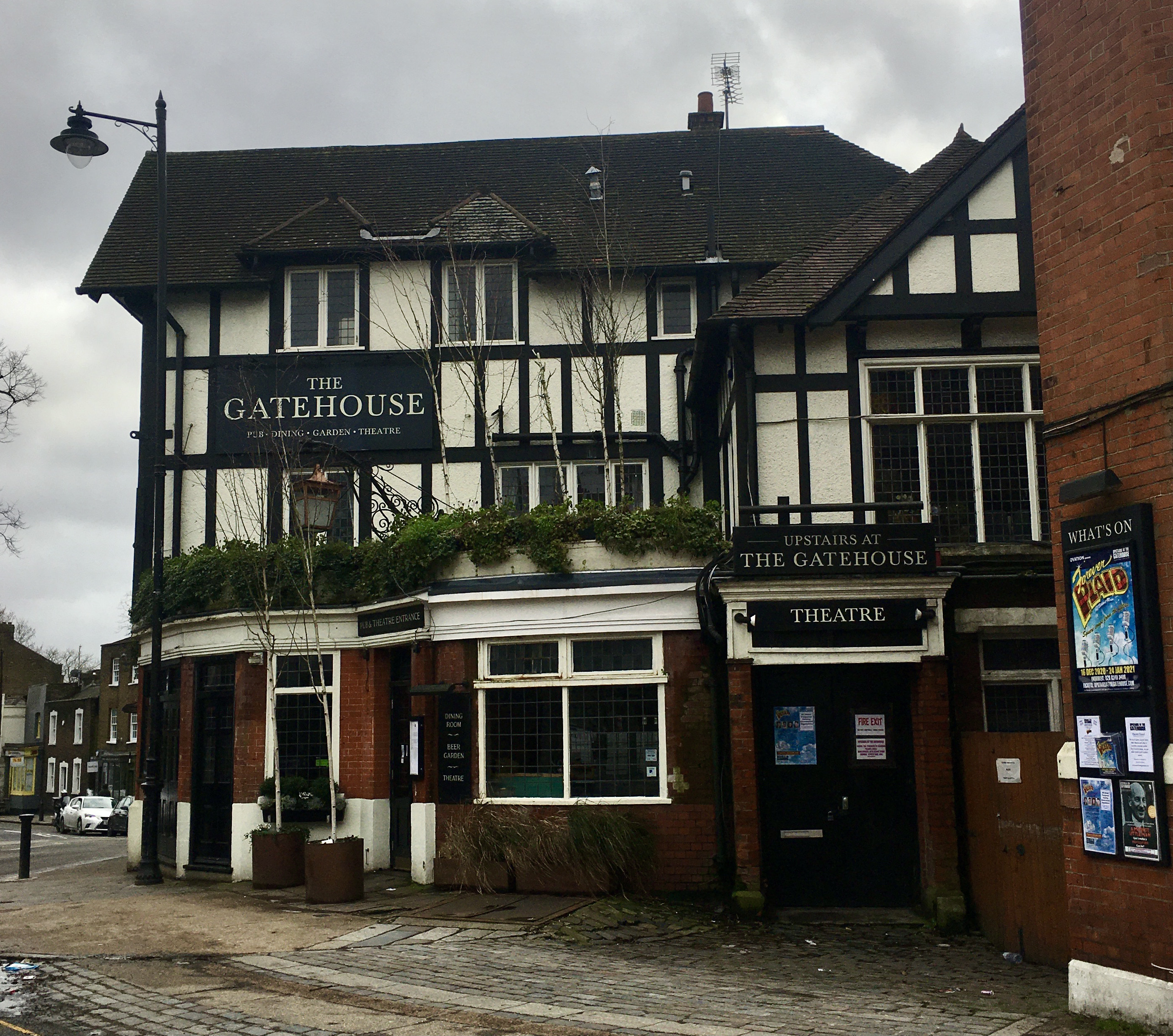
- Exterior of The Gatehouse pub.
- Interactive map of Upstairs at The Gatehouse
- Address: Highgate Village; London, N6; England
- Capacity: 122 or 140 (with cabaret seating)
- Public transit: Highgate

Website
- www.upstairsatthegatehouse.com

Upstairs at the Gatehouse is an Off-West End theatre in Highgate in the London Borough of Camden.

The venue is a refurbished 1895 auditorium, upstairs from the Gatehouse pub, which has served over the years as a music hall, cinema, Masonic lodge, and a jazz and folk music club. Upstairs at the Gatehouse was created by Ovation Theatres Limited (directors John and Katie Plews). The company has owned the theatre since 1997. The Gatehouse pub is owned and operated by Urban Pubs.

TimeOut described it in 2010 as "one of London's most reliable fringe musical theatre venues".
