= National Earthquake Information Center =

US Geological Survey science center

The National Earthquake Information Center (abbreviated NEIC) is part of the United States Geological Survey (USGS) located on the campus of the Colorado School of Mines in Golden, Colorado. The NEIC has three main missions:

- First, the NEIC determines, as rapidly and as accurately as possible, the location and size of all significant earthquakes that occur worldwide. The NEIC disseminates this information immediately to concerned national and international agencies, scientists, critical facilities, and the general public.
- Second, the NEIC collects and provides to scientists and to the public an extensive seismic database that serves as a solid foundation for scientific research, principally through the operation of modern digital national and global seismograph networks and through cooperative international agreements. The NEIC is the U.S. national data center and archive for earthquake information.
- Third, the NEIC pursues an active research program to improve its ability to locate earthquakes and to understand the earthquake mechanism. These efforts are all aimed at mitigating the risks of earthquakes to mankind; and they are made possible by the fine international cooperation that has long characterized the science of seismology.

Using a combination of automated tools and human review, NEIC issues moment magnitude and location information as soon as possible after a quake. As earthquake waves take time to travel around the globe, the estimated moment magnitude may change as more information is received. The NEIC uses seismograms recorded in the United States as well as around the globe. While they gather as much data as they can, some nations do not release earthquake data to the United States for political reasons.

NEIC personnel are often sought out by the news media after a large earthquake as experts. Thus the NEIC has a higher public profile than other parts of the US Geological Survey.

== See also ==
- Waverly Person
