= Pond Square =

Garden square in Highgate, London

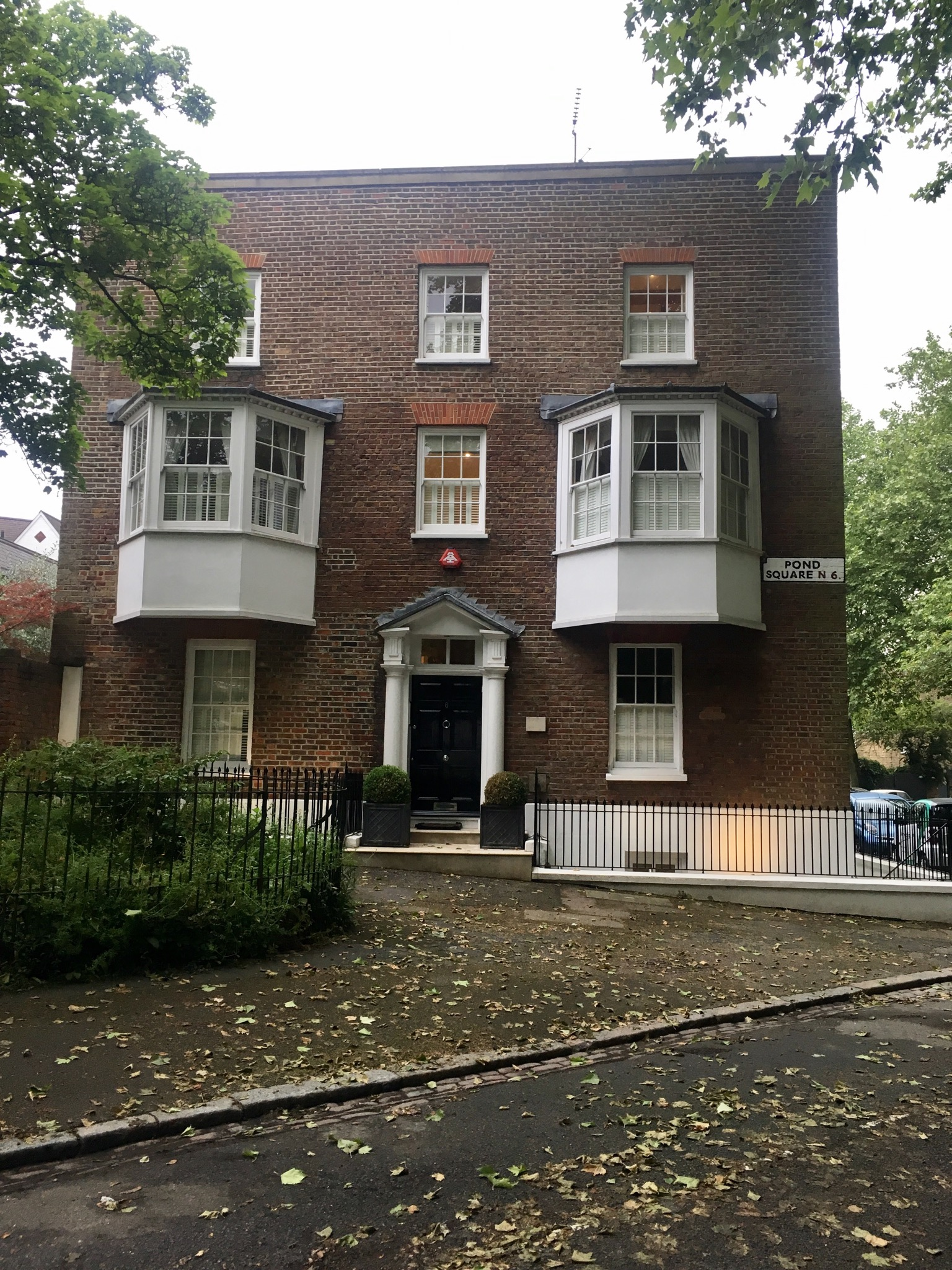
Rock House, Pond Square.

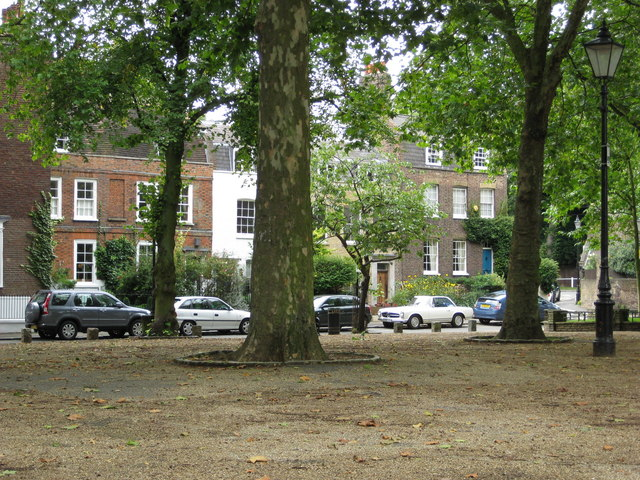
Pond Square.

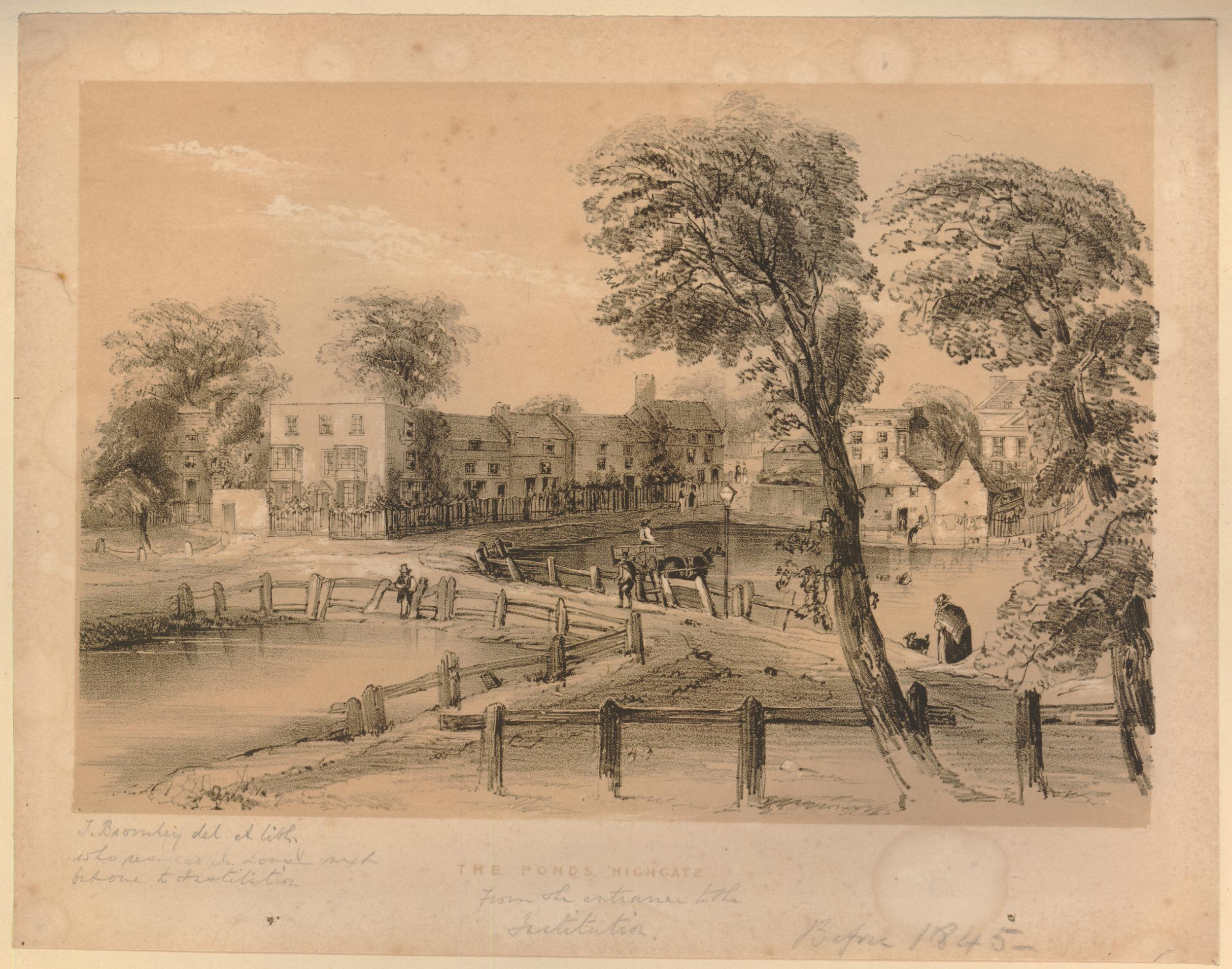
Depiction of the square in the early nineteenth century when the pounds were still there.

Pond Square is a garden square and village green in Highgate, London. Located close to Highgate High Street and The Gatehouse it is today in the London Borough of Camden. Swain's Lane runs off the square heading downhill past Highgate Cemetery.

It takes its name from the ponds that used to exist there, created by sand and gravel extraction. They were filled in during the nineteenth century. Once an open treeless space, houses were slowly added over the centuries. A number date back to the eighteenth century.

In 1814 Hornsey parish established a fire station in the square. A number of building on Highgate High Street back onto the east side of Pond Square including the rear of The Prince of Wales pub. A number of buildings are now listed.

== Bibliography ==
- Bebbington, Gillian. London Street Names. Batsford, 1972.
- Cherry, Bridget & Pevsner, Nikolaus. London 4: North. Yale University Press, 2002.
- Denford, Steven & Hayes, David A. Streets of Highgate. Camden History Society, 2007.
