= Peerson =

Peerson is a surname. Notable people with the surname include:

- Cleng Peerson (1783–1865), Norwegian-American pioneer
- Jack Peerson (1910–1966), American baseball player
- Martin Peerson (1570s–1650s), English musician and composer

== See also ==
- Pearson (surname)
