= Swearing on the Horns =

Farcical oath given to visitors in 17-19th century

Swearing on the Horns, an engraving from Chambers Book of Days, 1869

Swearing on the Horns is a farcical oath that was traditionally given to visitors at various pubs in the north London suburb of Highgate during the 17th, 18th and 19th centuries. The oath consists of a series of statements read by a clerk, confirming one's dedication to merriment and debauchery; those being sworn in would agree to each statement, kiss or salute a set of horns, and be entered in a logbook for posterity.

The proceedings were typically overseen by the landlord—referred to as the Master, the Father, or the Host—often dressed in formal costume, such as that of a barrister. In some houses, an "initiation fee" of money or drinks was required in addition to the oath; in others, the fee could be paid to bypass the ceremony altogether. Participants were then awarded the title of "Freemen of Highgate".

The ceremony was a source of amusement for regular customers, who would do their best to convince newcomers to take part in the swearing in. The details of the swearing took various forms across the years and from pub to pub, but maintained the common themes of the horns and many of the individual statements. It seems clear that most participants understood it to be a tourist trap, but were happy to take part in it just the same.

== Oath ==
While some versions are quite long—one source depicts a ceremony with six stanzas—the best-known points are:

"You must not eat brown bread while you can get white, except you like the brown the best. You must not drink small beer while you can get strong, except you like the small the best. You must not kiss the maid while you can kiss the mistress, except you like the maid the best, but sooner than lose a good chance you may kiss them both."

The exception clauses make clear that the oath is not an oath at all; one may do as one pleases. Other parts of the oath include pledges to be kind to one's wife, to remember that the man is the head of his household, and to bring new initiates on one's next visit.

== Privileges ==
Swearing on the Horns and becoming Freemen of Highgate conferred several privileges, though the privileges were subject to several conditions and often turned out to be no privilege at all. The immediate reward was to kiss the prettiest woman in the pub; if no pretty women were to be found, the new initiate had to settle for less.

If a Freeman in need of a rest were in Highgate, he could kick a pig out of a ditch and take its place. But if there were three pigs in the ditch, he could only chase away the middle one and sleep between the other two. If a Freeman found himself penniless in Highgate, he could have free drinks for himself and his friends, but if any money was found on him (or if it was found he had given it to his friends to hold) he had to buy a round of drinks for the house.

== History ==
The earliest known references to the Highgate horns date to the seventeenth century. In 1638, the poet Richard Brathwaite alludes to the custom in his poem Barnabee's Journal; Matthew Steggle proposes that two plays from the beginning of the century, John Marston's Jack Drum's Entertainment and Ben Jonson's A Private Entertainment at Highgate refer to the custom. The ceremony is mentioned in a burlesque routine, performed in Haymarket Theatre in 1742.

The 1785 edition of Grose's Classical Dictionary of the Vulgar Tongue held that the oath had been invented by a landlord of one of the public houses, to entertain guests and con newcomers out of some money. According to Grose, the custom had fallen into disuse at that time, which—considering its wide popularity in the early 19th century — indicates that swearing on the horns came in and out of fashion over the centuries.

At one time, members of all social classes took part in the swearing in. In Childe Harold's Pilgrimage, Lord Byron alludes to it.:

"Many to the steep of Highgate hie;

Ask, ye Boeotian shades! the reason why?
'Tis to the worship of the solemn Horn,
Grasped in the holy hand of Mystery,
In whose dread name both men and maids are sworn,

And consecrate the oath with draught and dance till morn."

— Byron

Young people would make mock pilgrimages from the city to experience the festivities, and by 1826 there were at least 19 different pubs in Highgate performing the ceremony. Some pubs would display a set of horns over their doors to indicate that travellers could be sworn in and made Freemen there.

By the mid-19th century, however, the tradition began to lose its popularity and had almost completely died out by 1875.

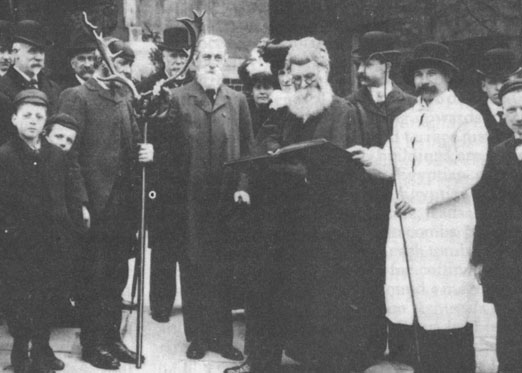
Swearing on the Horns in 1906.

The custom is examined in detail in George Walter Thornbury's Old and New London from 1874. Thornbury believes the custom is at least as old as the Reformation and states that the text "was originally intended as a parody on the admission of neophytes into religious guilds and confraternities by the clergy of the Catholic Church". He holds that the ceremony began at the Gate House Inn (the site of the gate from which Highgate draws its name) as a club for travellers along the cattle route to Smithfield.

In 1906, members of the Hampstead Antiquarian and Historical Society held a public re-enactment of the ceremony at what was by then known as the Old Gate House Hotel. Throughout the 20th century the tradition was once again revived, and continues to be conducted on special occasions at certain Highgate pubs: The Wrestlers conducts theirs twice annually, under a set of stag antlers.

In 2007 The Flask pub conducted the ceremony with a set of 200-year-old ram's horns taken from the Coopers Arms, as part of their beating the bounds festivities.

In 2014 the tradition was revived at The Bull pub in North Hill.

There was a presentation on the current and former pubs of Highgate, followed by the ceremony of Swearing on the Horns, at The Highgate Literary & Scientific Institution on the evening of Tuesday 14 June 2016. The London Brewing Company, co-sited with The Bull public house on North Hill N6, donated 18 gallons of a special, commemorative beer.

In 2019 Julian McDonnell participated in the ceremony at The Wrestlers pub, and published a video of the proceedings.
