= Leroy Person =

African American sculptor

- Leroy Person in his North Carolina studio with his works, 1981
- Born: Leroy Person; 1907; Occhmecchee Neck, North Carolina
- Died: 1985 (aged 77–78); Occhmeechee Neck, North Carolina
- Known for: Wood sculpture
- Movement: Modern Art

Leroy Person (1907–1985) was an American sculptor and wood carver from a remote region in northeastern North Carolina. Person's sculptures, and later, drawings, are recognized for their particular sensitivity to color and surface markings.

== Life ==
Leroy Person was born, raised, and lived out his entire life near the Albemare Sound at the edge of a swamp called Occhineechee Neck in northeast North Carolina. He was raised by a family of sharecroppers and continued the farm until he began working at a sawmill. He received partial schooling as a child and was para-literate. According to Roger Manley, director of the Gregg Museum of Art and Design at North Carolina State University, Person wrote and operated under his own numerals and alphabet that he and a few other family members could decipher.

Person was married to Frances Person, an accomplished quilter and artist herself, and their daughter was named Rosemary Person. After Leroy Person was hospitalized in 1982 for acute asthma, without access to his tools or his strength for carving, he began drawing with crayon on paper and cardboard. Although his oeuvre of drawings is not as prolific as his sculptures, he made a significant body of work before dying in 1985 from respiratory disease. Daughter Rosemary continued making art in her father's style for several years after his death, with the result that some pieces in well-known collections are misidentified as his.

== Career ==
Leroy Person worked for the sawmill his entire adult life, until work-related respiratory problems forced his retirement in the mid 1960s. After his retirement, with little else to occupy his time, Person he began carving and etching into his fence and the siding of his house. His decorations went unnoticed or unappreciated by family, and feeling discouraged, Person disposed of his first works. After much encouragement from his neighbor, Ozette Bell, Person picked up carving again on free-standing wood pieces and began to carve what is now recognized as a cohesive body of sculptures and furniture. Although none were photographed, art historians note that Person also weaved meticulous baskets. This is an indication that other members of his family were skilled crafts-people because the intricate skills of basketry are rarely self-taught.

=== Subject and inspiration ===
Person's works frequently employ images of trees, animals, his tools, and circles (which often resemble saw blades), letters and numerals of his own creation. His work has often been compared to Sub-Saharan African sculpture for its dense geometric patterns. William Arnett likened his freestanding sculptures to that of the Dogon people of Mali while Colin Rhodes compared his furniture to the Bambara people of the African Niger River region. Despite these comparisons, Person's works are sui generis. They are simultaneously a product of centuries of African culture in America and his life spent virtual isolation in Ochineechee Neck.

Person often colored his wooden sculptures and furniture with crayons, which created a dichotomy between his very delicate color palette and the bold weight of his material. Some of Person's patterns of color and etching mimic his wife, Frances's, quilting patterns, although no one photographed her quilts to make a formal comparison. The similarities were even more apparent after Person switched from sculpture to drawing while hospitalized during the last three years of his life. Most of his drawings comprised squares and rectangles filled with contrasting colors, which distinctly resemble improvisational African American quilts of the southeast.

== Exhibitions and permanent collections ==
Leroy Person's work has been shown in the following exhibitions:

1. Outside the Mainstream: Folk Art in Our Time. High Museum of Art at Georgia-Pacific Center. Atlanta, GA (May - Aug. 1988)
2. Signs and Wonders: Outsider Art inside North Carolina. North Carolina Museum of Art. Raleigh, NC. (1989)
3. Ashe: Improvisation & Recycling in African-American Visionary Art. Diggs Gallery, Winston-Salem State University, Winston-Salem, NC (2 Feb- 29 Mar. 1993)
4. Outsider Art: An Exploration of Chicago Collections. Chicago Cultural Center, Chicago, IL ( 9 Dec. 1996- 3 Feb. 1997)
5. Self-Taught Artists of the Twentieth Century: An American Anthology. Philadelphia Museum of Art. Philadelphia, PA (1998)
6. Leroy Person, Luise Ross Gallery, New York, NY (2000)
7. New Location. Luise Ross Gallery, New York, NY (15 Oct. – 12 Nov. 2005)
8. Fun! Luise Ross Gallery. New York, NY (29 June – 28 July 2006)
9. Amazing Grace: Self-Taught Artists from the Mullis Collection. Georgia Museum of Art, University of Georgia, Athens, GA (29 Sep. 2007 – 6 Jan. 2008)
10. Ascension II: A Legacy of Self-Taught African American Artists of North Carolina. Diggs Gallery, Winston-Salem State University, Winston-Salem, NC (12 Jan- 22 Mar. 2008)

Person's work exists in the following permanent collections:

1. Smithsonian American Art Museum
2. American Folk Art Museum
3. High Museum of Art
4. The Robert Lynch Collection of Outsider Art in the Four Sisters Gallery Permanent Collection of Self-Taught Art_North Carolina Wesleyan College
