= Waverly Person =

American seismologist (1926–2022)

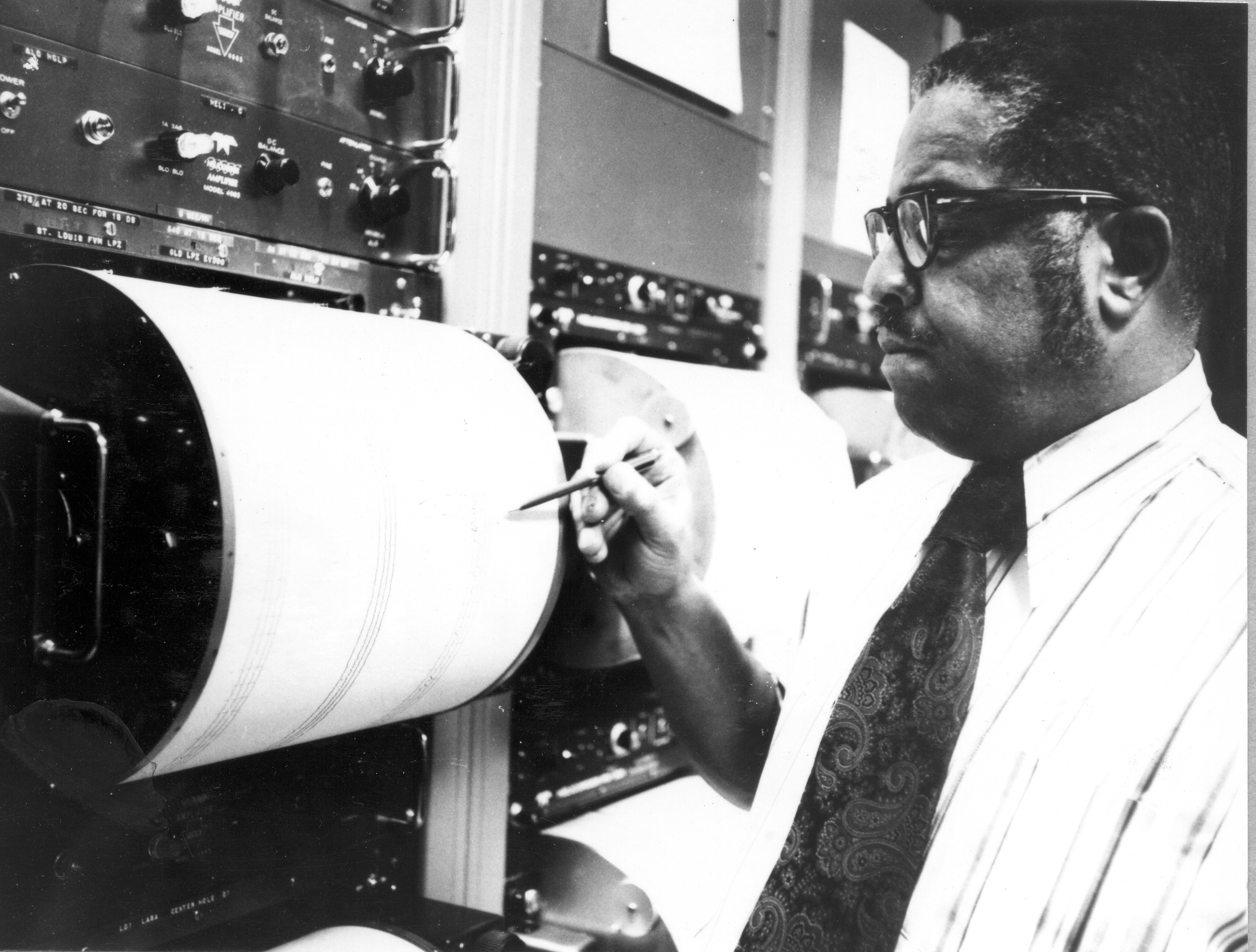
- Person in 1985
- Born: May 1, 1926; Mecklenburg County, Virginia, U.S.
- Died: February 10, 2022 (aged 95); Boulder, Colorado, U.S.
- Education: Saint Paul Normal and Industrial School; Saint Paul's College
- Awards: Good Conduct Medal; Asiatic–Pacific Campaign Medal
- Scientific career
- Workplaces: National Earthquake Information Center; United States Department of Commerce; United States Army

Waverly J. Person (May 1, 1926 – February 10, 2022) was an American seismologist. He started his professional career in the United States Army, during which time he was awarded both the Good Conduct Medal and Asiatic–Pacific Campaign Medal. In the early 1970s Person helped to established the National Earthquake Information Center.

== Early life and education ==
Person was born at the county line between Brunswick and Mecklenburg Counties, Virginia. His parents, Bessie Butts and Santee Person, had twelve children, all of whom worked on the family farm. The family farm raised tobacco, cotton and peanuts. For elementary school he attended Good Hope School. Person attended Saint Paul Normal and Industrial School, which was the high school associated with Saint Paul's College. As a high school senior he was drafted into the United States Army, and served in both World War II and the Korean War. At nineteen years old, Person was sent to New Guinea as part of the segregated, all-Black 93rd Infantry Division. He was eventually promoted to first sergeant. As nuclear bombs were dropped on Hiroshima and Nagasaki, Person found himself on board a boat to mainland Japan. The soldiers had not been told that the Japanese were about to surrender, and headed toward the area ready to mount an invasion. When Person and the 93rd Infantry Division arrived, they were told they would have to wait for white soldiers to go first. Person raised his hand and told the captain, "Those bullets they're firing at us don't have white and black on them. They'll kill anybody that's in their way." In between his military service, Person returned to Saint Paul's College, where he studied mathematics. Although he was interested in research, he did not have the finances to continue his education beyond his bachelor's degree.

== Research and career ==
After completing his degree in mathematics, Person joined the United States Department of Commerce as a physical science technician. In the late 1950s the Department of Commerce was responsible for monitoring earthquake activity. He used a seismograph that was set up in the lobby of the Herbert C. Hoover Building. Person was responsible for the maintenance of the seismograph, and changed the rotating drums that recorded the seismic activity. Person first became involved with science communication in the lobby of the Commerce building, telling the curious people who crowded around the seismograph about earthquakes. He achieved his professional status in geophysics after the 1964 Alaska earthquake.

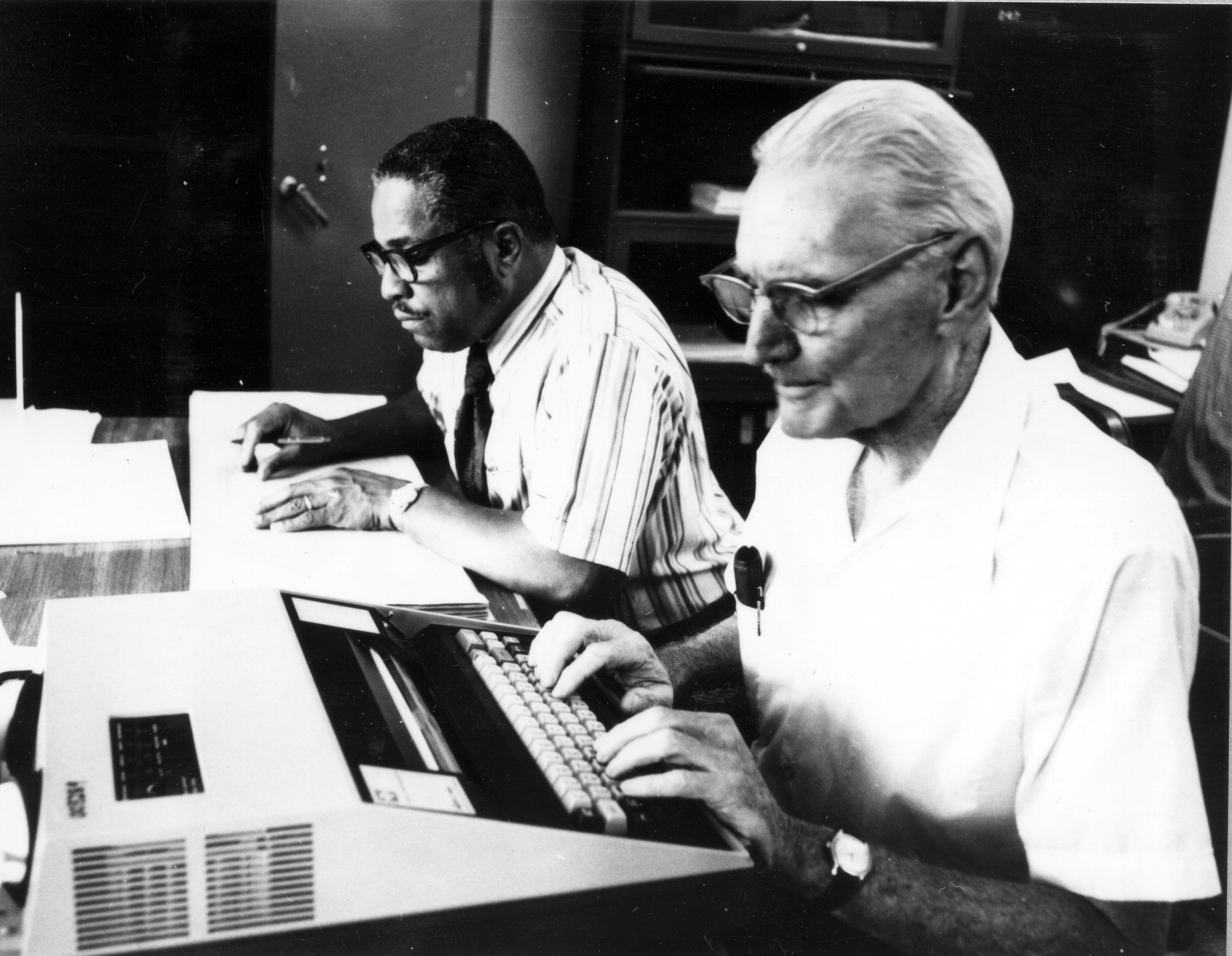
Geophysicist Waverly Person (left) reads the time of first arrival of the P wave from a seismogram

In 1973 Person helped to establish the United States Geological Survey (USGS) National Earthquake Information Center (NEIC), which relocated earthquake monitoring out of the Department of Commerce and into its own building in Golden, Colorado. After five years at the center, Person was promoted to Chief, and responsible for designing the scientific research programme of the NEIC, as well as interacting with the media. He was the first African American to hold such a senior position in the United States Department of the Interior, and one of the first African American professionals in earthquake seismology. In 1988 Person was awarded the Special Achievement Award of the National Association of Government Communicators in honour of his success in dealing with the media, and in 1991 the Boulder County Multicultural Award. Person was also responsible for the Bulletin of the Seismological Society of America Seismological Notes. Person became known as Mr. Earthquake and was a regular feature on television programmes and in classrooms. In 1999 he delivered evidence before the United States Congress on earthquake preparedness.

In 2003 Person was awarded the American Association of Petroleum Geologists Harrison Schmitt Award for his "contributions to the field of earthquake studies and establishment of the National Earthquake Information Center". Person retired in 2006. He said that he planned to spend his retirement educating minority students about seismology.

== Personal life and death ==
Person met his wife, Sarah Walker, while a student at Saint Paul's College. Person was involved with the fight for civil rights, and walked alongside Martin Luther King Jr. during the March on Washington for Jobs and Freedom.

He died in Boulder, Colorado, on February 10, 2022, at the age of 95.

== Select publications ==
- Herd, Darrell G.; Youd, T. Leslie; Meyer, Hansjürgen; C, Jorge Luis Arango; Person, Waverly J.; Mendoza, Carlos (January 30, 1981). "The Great Tumaco, Colombia Earthquake of 12 December 1979". Science. 211 (4481): 441–445. Bibcode:1981Sci...211..441H. doi:10.1126/science.211.4481.441. ISSN 0036-8075. PMID 17816596.
- "Seismological notes—September-October 1987". Bulletin of the Seismological Society of America. 78 (4): 1621–1626. August 1, 1988. Bibcode:1988BuSSA..78.1621.. doi:10.1785/BSSA0780041621.
- "Seismological notes— March-April 1990". Bulletin of the Seismological Society of America. 81 (1): 297–302. February 1, 1991. Bibcode:1991BuSSA..81..297.. doi:10.1785/BSSA0810010297.
