= The Flask, Highgate =

Grade II listed pub in Highgate, London

Coordinates: 51°34′11″N 0°9′4″W

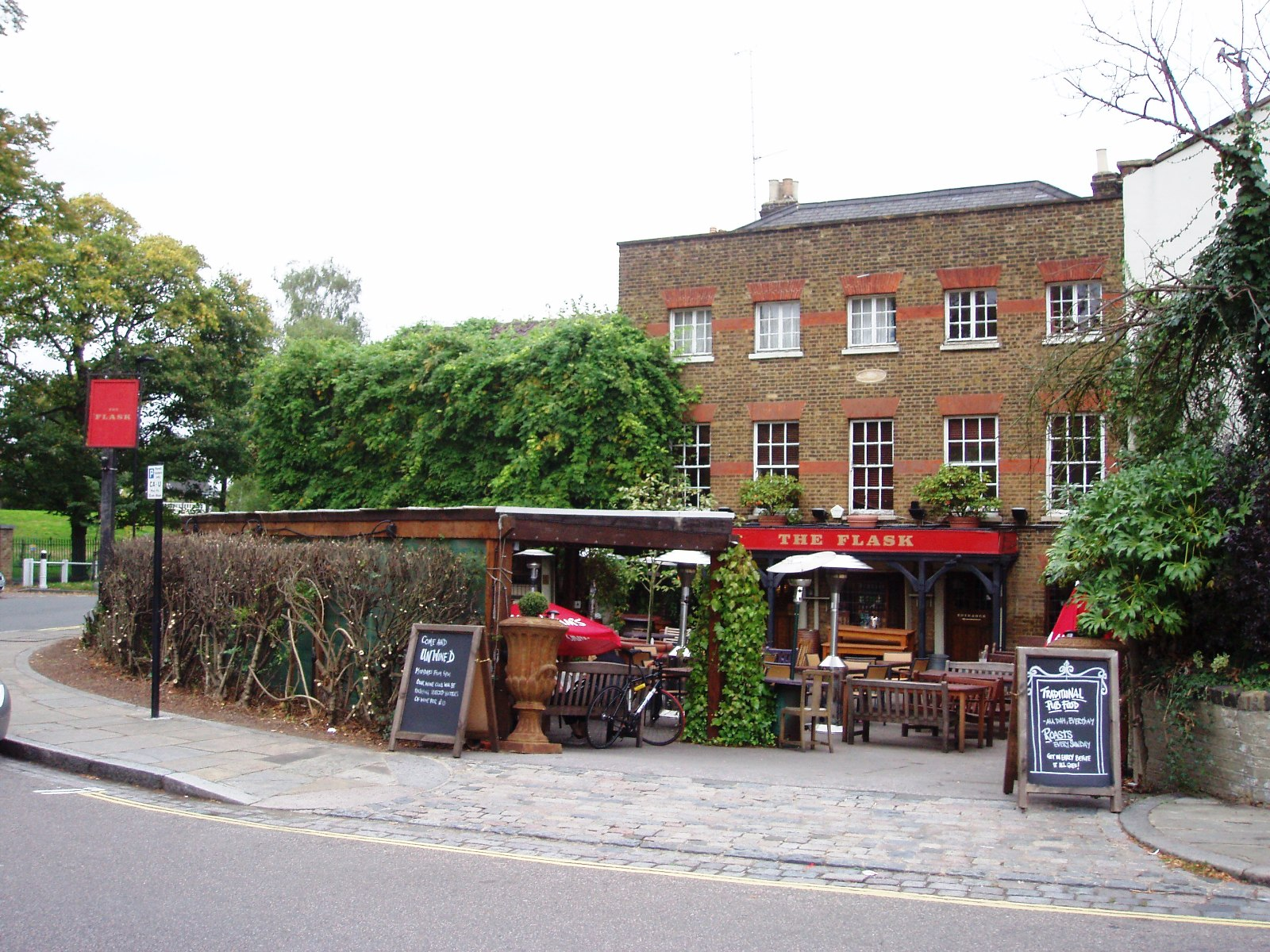
The Flask, Highgate

The Flask is a Grade II listed public house at 74–76 Highgate West Hill, Highgate, London. According to the 1936 Survey of London, a pub known as The Flask has stood on this spot since "at least as early as 1663". The present buildings probably date from the early 18th century, and were partially rebuilt in about 1767 by William Carpenter. A Manorial court met there in the eighteenth century. The Flask is currently owned and operated by the London-based Fuller's.

== History ==
The pub is believed to have been named after the flasks of Hampstead mineral water that could be purchased here when Hampstead was popular for its wells in the 18th century, and The Flask, Flask Walk, Hampstead, is another pub nearby. Like all good pubs, The Flask has its own legends which may or may not be true. It is said that the highwayman Dick Turpin hid from the law in the stables there, that the artist William Hogarth drank at the bar and even that Karl Marx was a customer. For good measure, the pub is also said by some to have a female ghost. It was also reported in 1736 a 64 year-old man, accompanied by a hairdresser, ran from the Bull's Head in St Giles to The Flask in just 45 minutes, "To the Surprize of every Body who was present". The pub is sometimes included as part of the Karl Marx pub crawl due to its association with the philosopher.

The pub was used in a Christmas 1995 television commercial for Carlsberg Lager, the 60-second film "Last Orders" opens at The Flask and shows two men drinking and laughing as the minutes fly by to closing time. As they emerge from the pub, they literally stop in their tracks as they realise there has been a major snowfall. The commercial’s soundtrack also stops for a second as the camera surveys the whitened scene. The subtitle asks ‘The best closing time in the world?’ before both of the men agree that it is as they hare off into the snow like excited children.

== Interior ==
English Heritage note that in the original building (the unexpanded pub), the lower bars, named the "Snug" and "Committee Room" respectively contain 1930s fireplaces and matchboard panelling, and that between these two areas lies a central bar, which is enclosed by sliding sashes with glazing bars, and are "perhaps a mixture of late C18 and 1930s work". Behind this lies a circa 1700 dog-leg stairway "with turned balusters on a closed string".

== "Swearing on the horns" ==
The Flask is one of those that still participates in the old ritual of "The Swearing on the Horns" which involves visitors swearing to drink only strong beer, eat only white bread and not brown, and not to kiss the maid if they could kiss the mistress, unless they preferred the maid or could kiss both. Having so sworn they must kiss a pair of horns, or a pretty girl if they saw one, and were then free of Highgate. The ritual is said to have been the source of the expression that a man was "Sworn at Highgate", meaning that he was a man of the world. Lord Byron took the oath, though not necessarily at The Flask, and devoted a verse of Childe Harold's Pilgrimage to it. The Flask was one of the pubs that used a pair of ram's horns, but other pubs in Highgate used either stag's or bullock's horns.

In its modern incarnation, the ritual has been performed at The Flask by Hornsey Round Table for 49 years (as of 2019) to raise money for charity.

== See also ==
- The Flask, Hampstead
