= Persons (surname) =

Persons is a surname. Notable people with the surname include:

- Alice N. Persons (born 1952), American poet
- Alisa Persons (born 1964), American writer and video filmmaker
- Ell Persons, African-American lynched in 1917
- Enos Warren Persons (1836–1899), American politician
- Fern Persons (1910–2012), American film actress
- Gordon Persons (1902–1965), American politician and 43rd Governor of Alabama
- Henry Persons (1834–1910), American politician, lawyer, and soldier
- James H. Persons (1829–1895), American politician
- Jenna Persons (born 1983), American politician
- John C. Persons (1888–1974), American military personnel
- John Persons (died 1424), English politician
- Peter Persons (born 1962), American professional golfer
- Robert Persons (1546–1610), English Jesuit priest
- Tayler Persons (born 1995), American basketball player
- Timothy Persons (born 1954), American author
- Wilton Persons (1896–1977), White House Chief of Staff to President Dwight D. Eisenhower

== See also ==
- Person (surname)
