= Holly Lodge Estate =

1920s housing estate in Highgate, London

Coordinates: 51°33′53.02″N 00°08′58.02″W

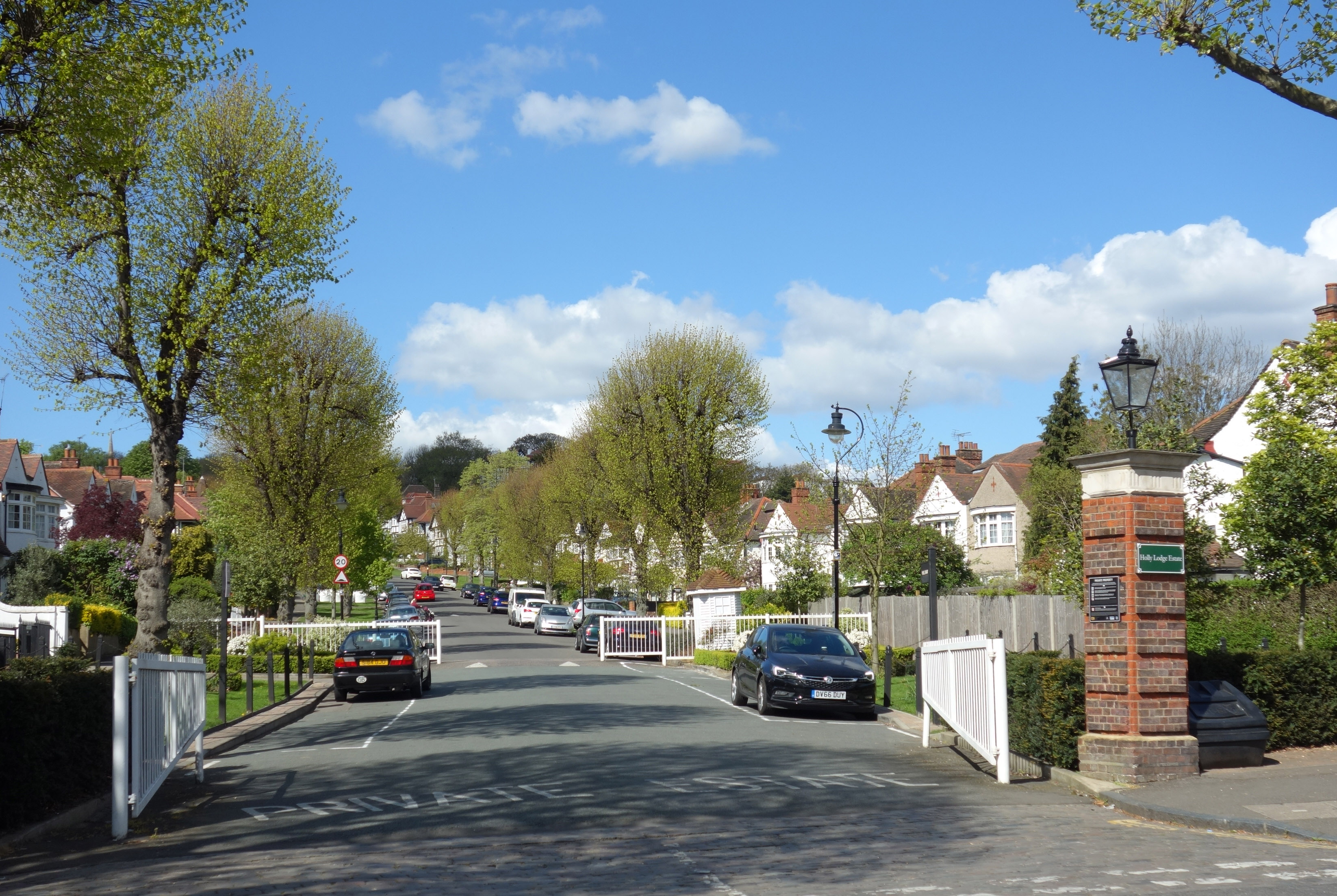
Entrance to the estate

The Holly Lodge Estate is a housing estate in Highgate in the London Borough of Camden. It has existed since the early 19th century, and was sold in 1923 before undergoing a large renovation. Most houses on the estate are two stories tall, and are separated by uniform gaps along a central avenue.

== Sources ==
- Cherry, Bridget and Pevsner, Nikolaus (1998).The Buildings of England London 4: North. Yale University Press. ISBN 0-300-09653-4.
