= Highgate =

Area of north London, England

Coordinates: 51.5716°N 0.1448°W

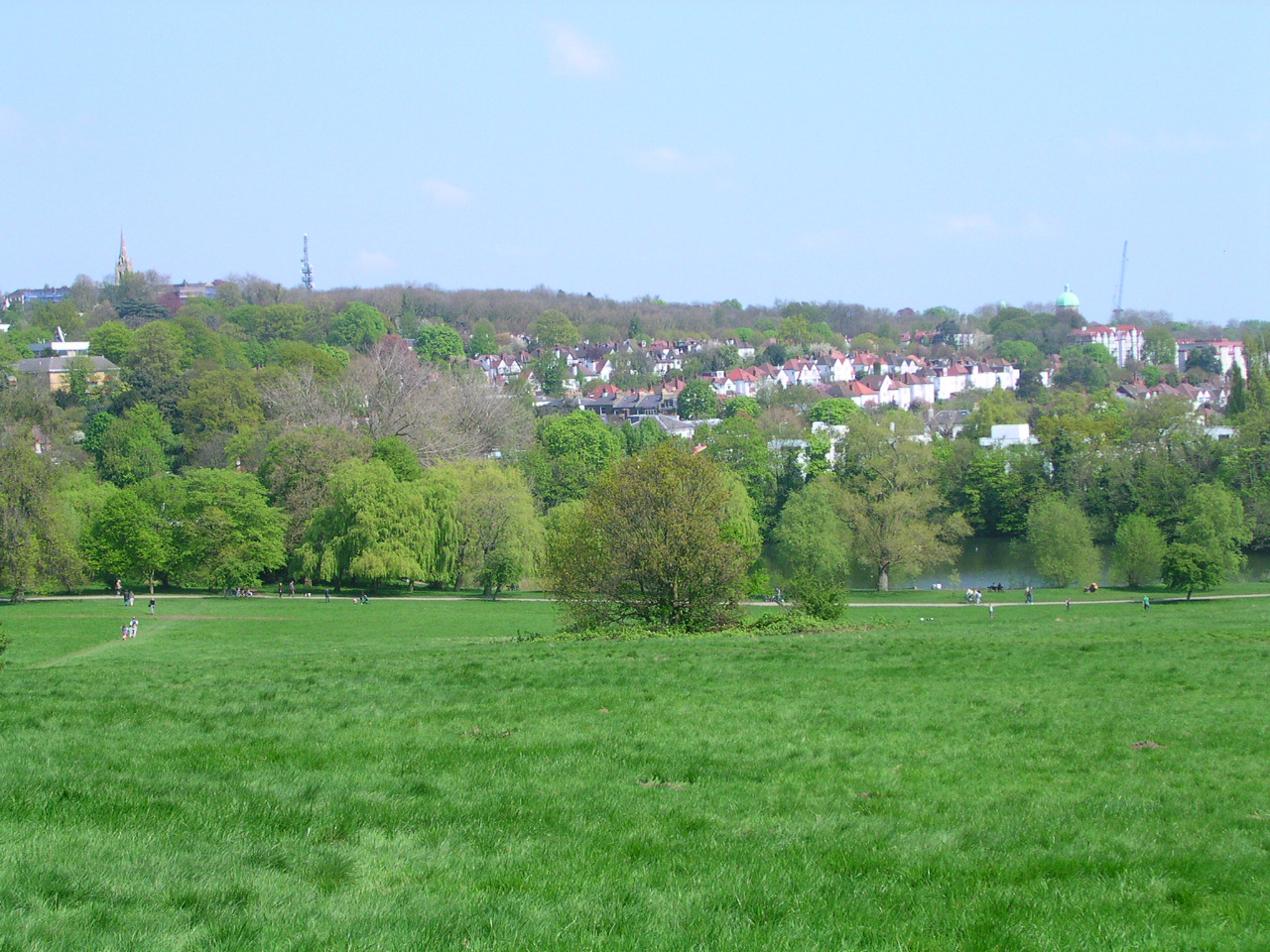
- Highgate seen from Parliament Hill. The spire of St Michael's Church is visible at the left, and the green dome of St Joseph's at the right.

- Location within Greater London
- Population: 10,955 (2011 Census)
- OS grid reference: TQ285875
- London borough: Camden; Haringey; Islington
- Ceremonial county: Greater London
- Region: London
- Country: England
- Sovereign state: United Kingdom
- Post town: LONDON
- Postcode district: N6
- Dialling code: 020
- Police: Metropolitan
- Fire: London
- Ambulance: London
- UK Parliament: Hampstead and Highgate, Islington North
- London Assembly: Barnet and Camden; Enfield and Haringey; North East

Highgate is an area of north London, which is divided among three London boroughs: Haringey in the north and east, Camden in the south and west, and Islington in the south and east. It lies at the north-eastern corner of Hampstead Heath, 4.5 mi (7 km) north-north-west of Charing Cross.

Highgate is one of the most expensive London areas in which to live. It has three conservation organisations: the Highgate Society, the Highgate Neighbourhood Forum and the Highgate Conservation Area Advisory Committee, to protect and enhance its character and amenities.

== History ==
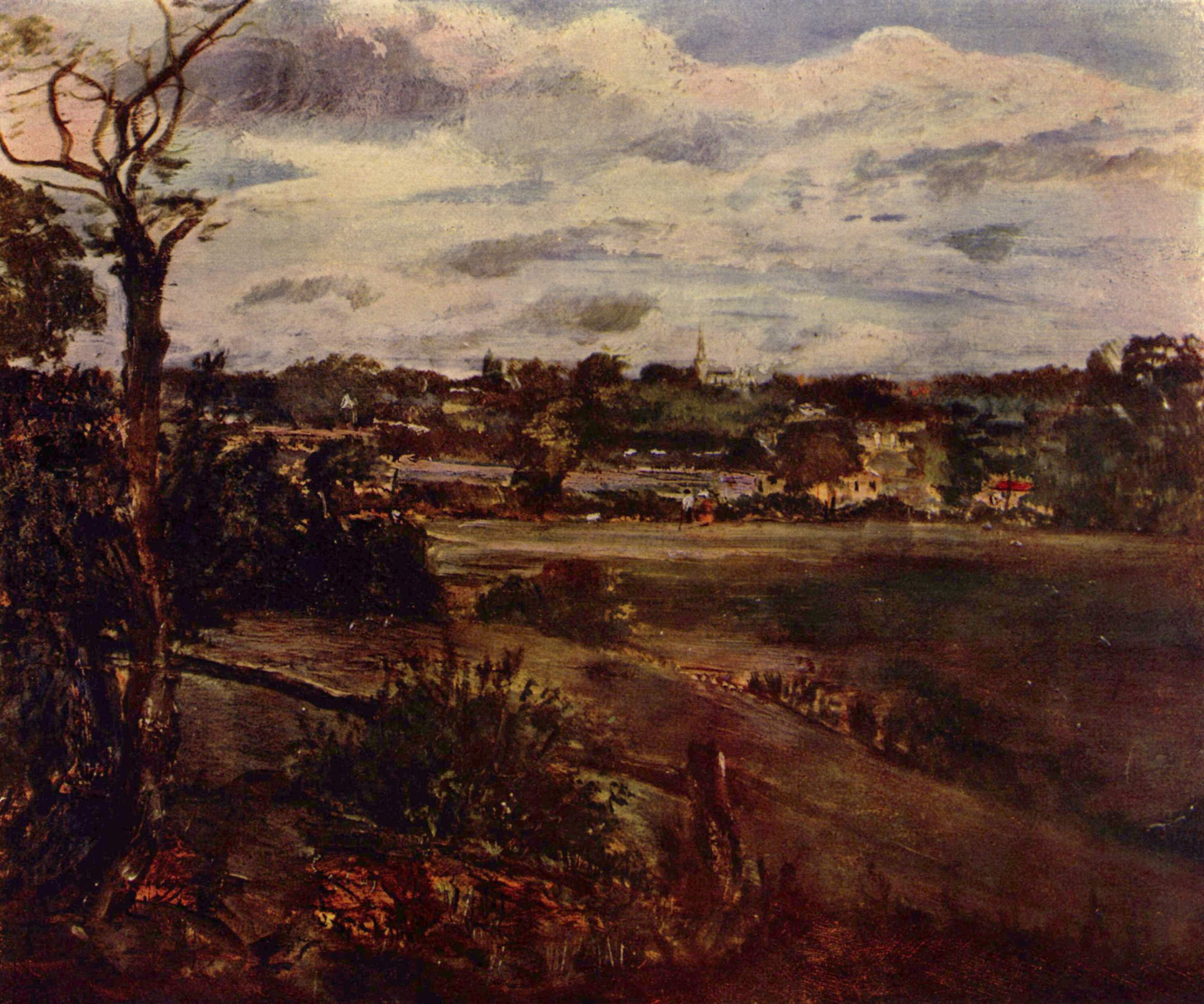
A view of Highgate, John Constable, 1st quarter of 19th century.

Historically, Highgate adjoined the Bishop of London's hunting estate. Highgate gets its name from these hunting grounds, as there was a high, deer-proof hedge surrounding the estate: 'the gate in the hedge'.

The bishop kept a toll-house where one of the main northward roads out of London entered his land. A number of pubs sprang up along the route, one of which, the Gatehouse, commemorates the toll-house.

Hampstead Lane and Highgate Hill contain the red brick Victorian buildings of Highgate School and its adjacent Chapel of St Michael. The school has played a role in the life of the village and has existed on its site since its founding was permitted by letters patent from Queen Elizabeth I in 1565.

From 1853 to 1940, the London Diocesan Penitentiary was sited on North Hill in Highgate. The area north of Hampstead Lane and east of the High Street was part of Hornsey parish and also later the Municipal Borough of Hornsey, and the seat of that borough's governing body for many years.

Until late Victorian times, it was a distinct village outside London, sitting astride the main road to the north. The area retains many green expanses, including the eastern part of Hampstead Heath, three ancient woods, Waterlow Park and the eastern-facing slopes, known as Highgate bowl.

Highgate Hill, a steep road linking Archway (traditionally called part of Upper Holloway) and Highgate village, was the route of the Highgate Hill Cable Tramway, the first cable car to be built in Europe. It operated between 1884 and 1909.

Like much of London, Highgate suffered damage during World War II by German air raids; Highgate tube station was used as a bomb shelter.

Highgate New Town is a post-war estate adjacent to the cemetery, designed by Camden Council with similarities to the Alexandra Road estate.

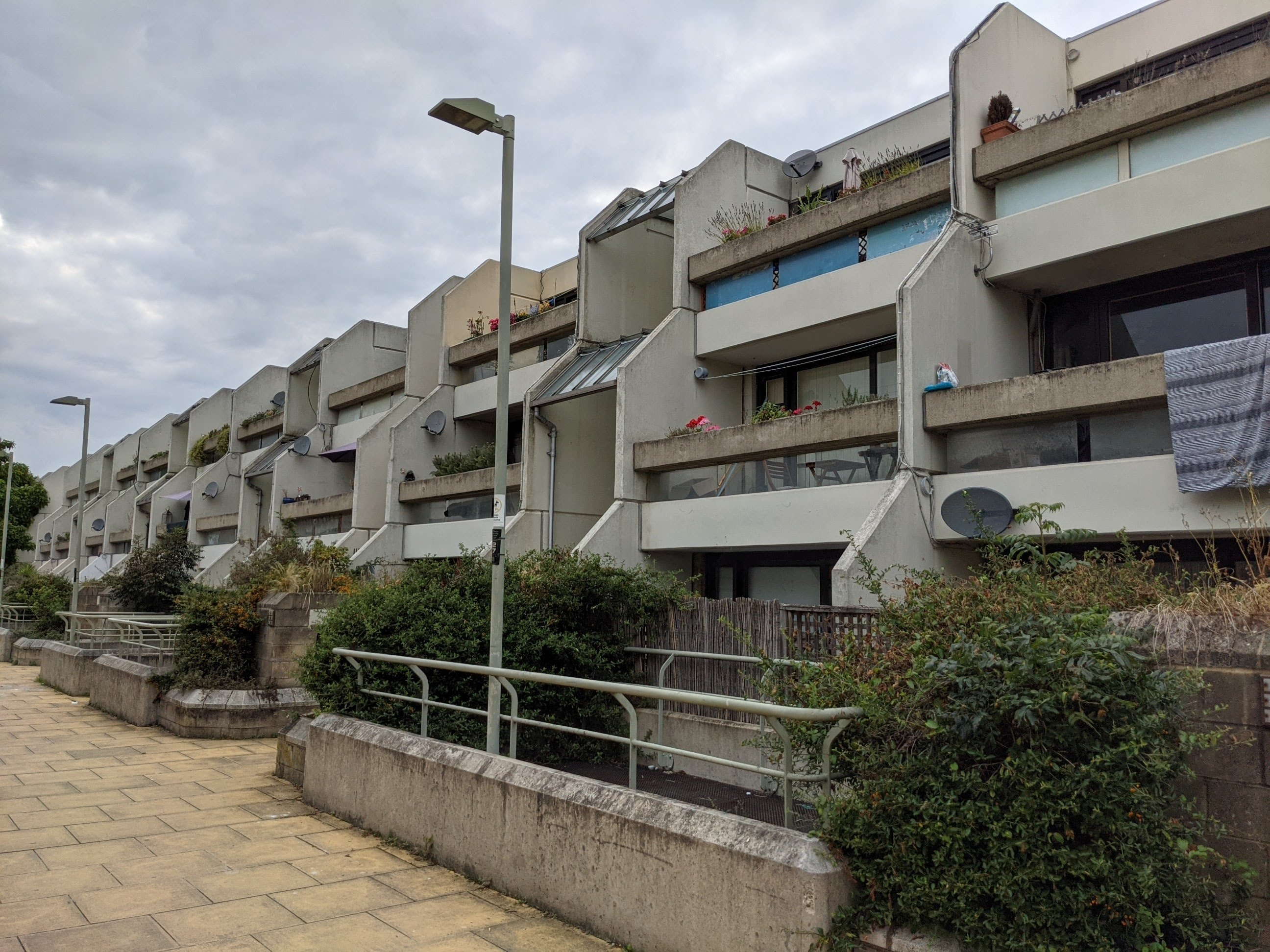
Whittington Estate, Highgate New Town

== Geography ==
The village lies at the top of Highgate Hill, which provides views across central London. Highgate is 136 m (446 ft) above sea level at its highest point.

=== Nearby places ===
- Archway
- Crouch End
- Dartmouth Park
- East Finchley
- Finchley
- Hampstead
- Hornsey
- Kentish Town
- Muswell Hill
- Tufnell Park
- Upper Holloway.

== Governance ==
Between 1983 and 2010, Highgate was part of the Hampstead and Highgate constituency. The Boundary Commission report of 2003 recommended removing the Camden part of Highgate from the remainder of that constituency and joining it with Kentish Town and Holborn to the south. This was to form an enlarged Holborn and St Pancras constituency from the 2010 general election.

Since 1983, the northern half of Highgate village was part of the Hornsey and Wood Green constituency. Until 2023, the southern half of Highgate was in the Holborn and St Pancras parliamentary constituency, whose MP is Sir Keir Starmer of the Labour Party, prime minister from 2024. The whole of Highgate Village is now part of the Hampstead and Highgate constituency.

== Amenities ==
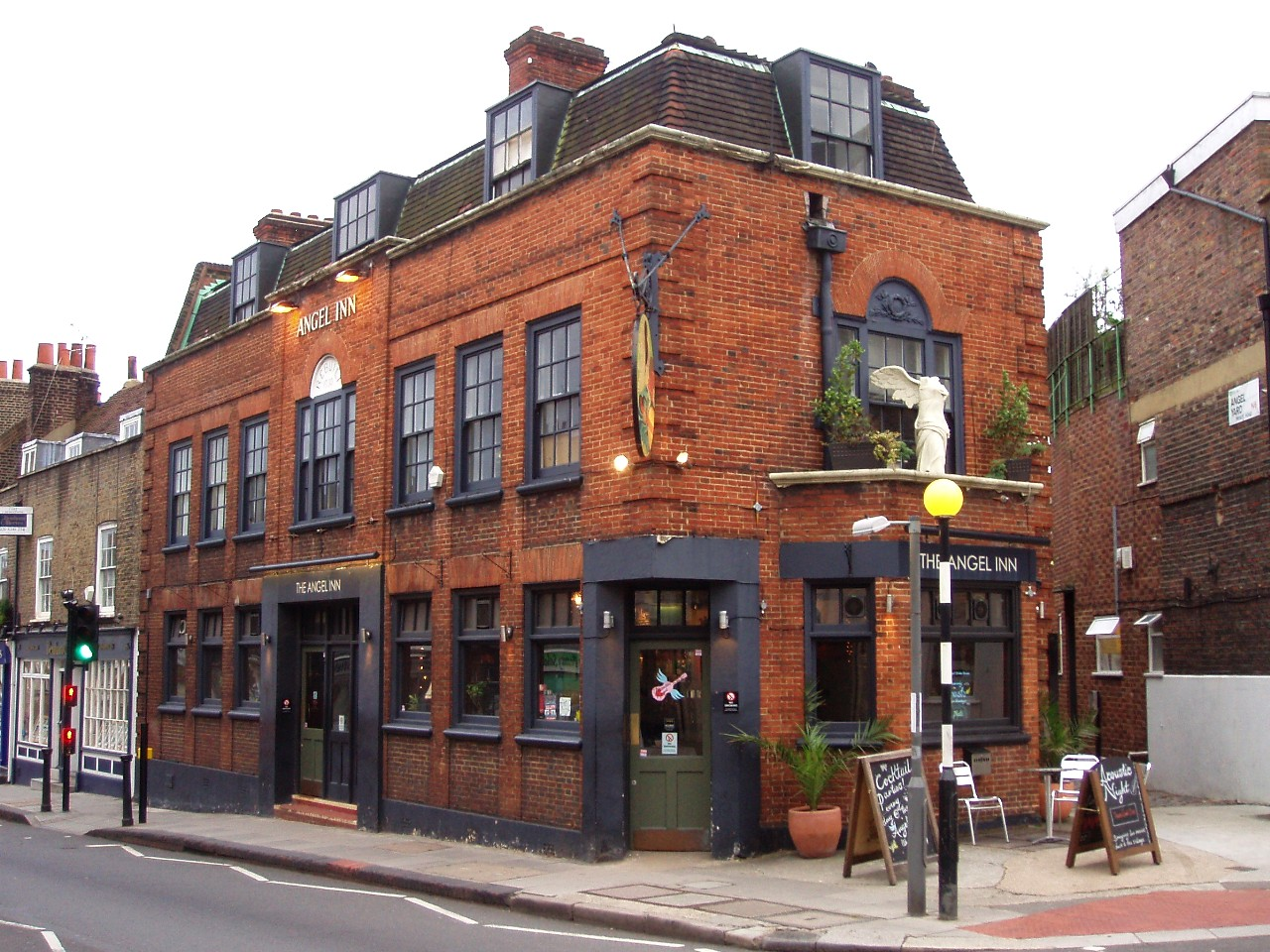
The Angel Inn

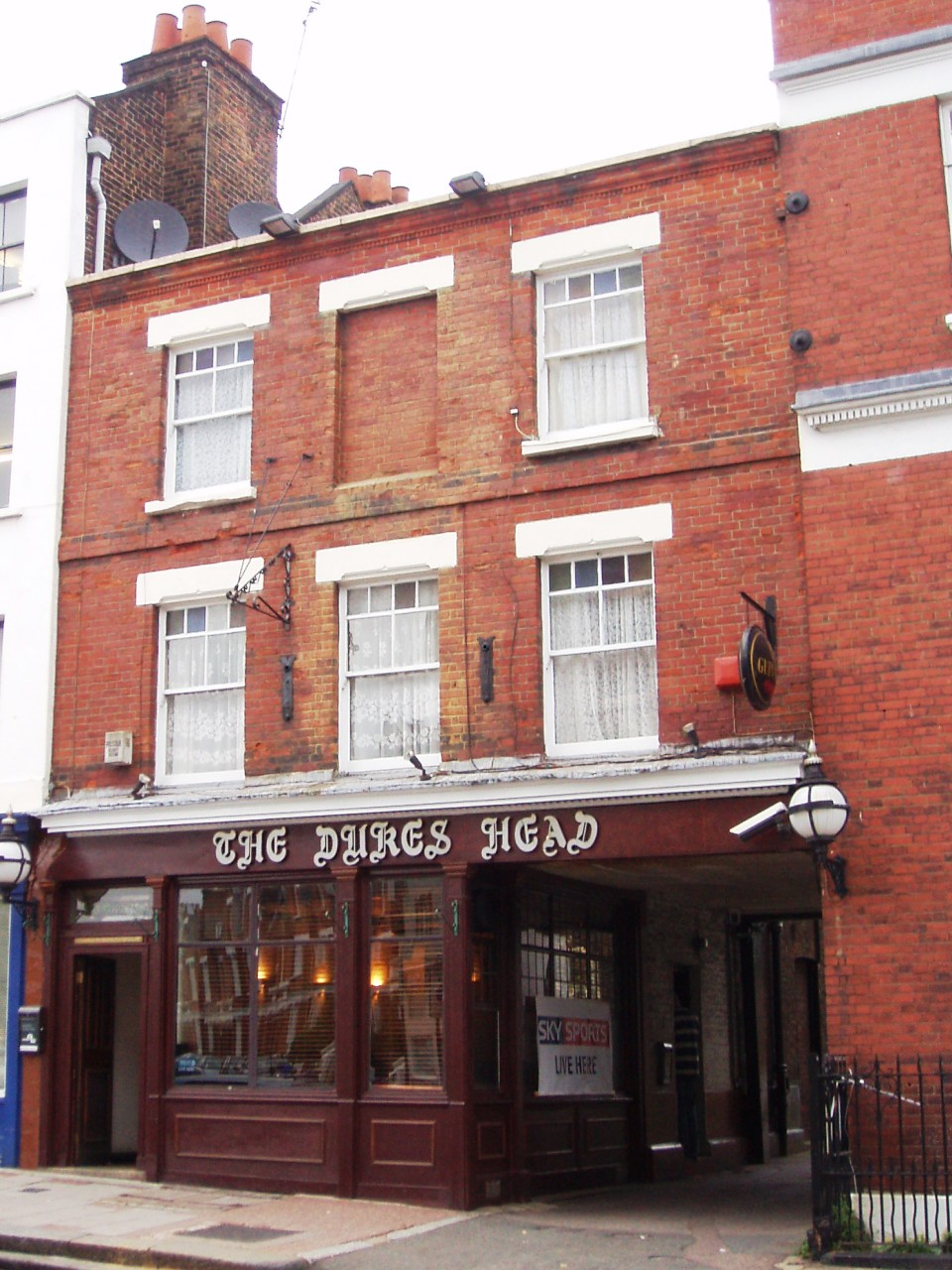
The Duke's Head

Highgate is best known for the Victorian Highgate Cemetery, in which the Communist philosopher Karl Marx and the novelist George Eliot are buried, among others.

Adjoining is Holly Village, the first gated community, built in 1865, which is a Grade II* listed site.

The area's centre is Highgate village, which is largely a collection of Georgian shops, pubs, restaurants and residential streets, interspersed with diverse landmarks, including Highgate School (1565); Jacksons Lane arts centre, housed in a Grade II listed former church; the Gatehouse Inn, dating from 1670, which houses the theatre Upstairs at the Gatehouse; and Berthold Lubetkin's 1930s Highpoint buildings.

Several pubs line the old high street and surrounding streets, including the Angel Inn, the Flask, the Duke's Head and the Wrestlers.

=== Places of interest ===
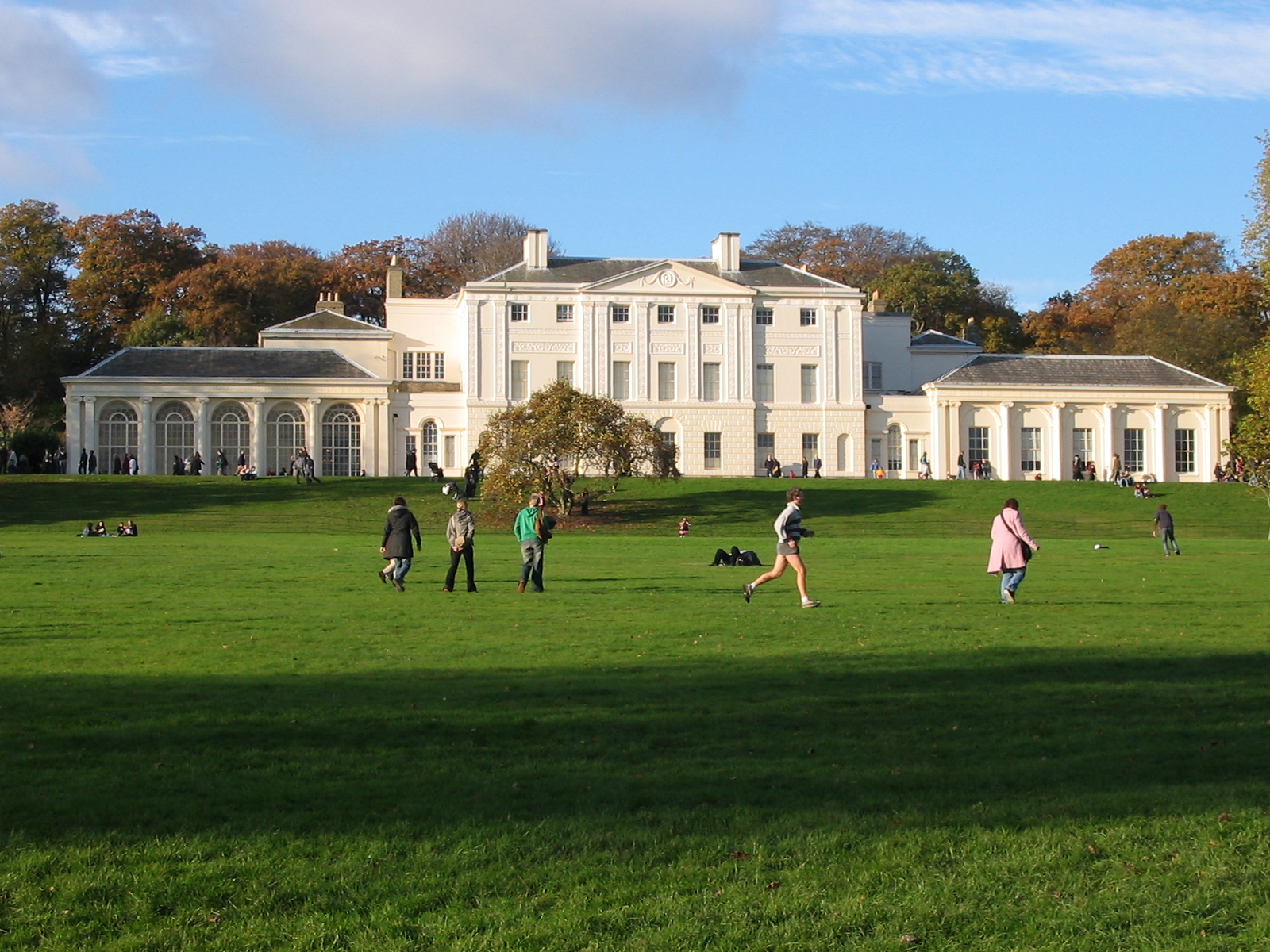
Kenwood House

Pond Square, behind Highgate High Street, is a registered village green and serves as a focal point for community activities. These include events and activities held at the Highgate Literary and Scientific Institution and the Highgate Society, whose buildings face the Square.

Others include:

- Archway Bridge
- Athlone House, formerly known as Caen Wood Towers, the home of the RAF Intelligence School 1942–48.
- Cromwell House
- Furnival House
- The Grove
- Highgate Wood
- Holly Lodge Estate
- Jacksons Lane
- Kenwood House
- Lauderdale House
- Witanhurst.

== Transport ==
Highgate, Archway and East Finchley London Underground stations serve the area on the Northern Line. They provide regular services to High Barnet and Mill Hill East to the north, with stops in Central London and Morden to the south.

London Buses 143, 210, 214 (24 hour), 263 and 310, plus Night Bus N263 all serve Highgate.

== Demography ==
The 2011 census showed that the Highgate ward of Haringey was 82% White (60% British, 19% Other, 3% Irish). 40.9% of the ward were Christian, 7% Jewish and 3.8% Muslim.

The Highgate ward of Camden meanwhile was 80% White (61% British, 15% Other, 4% Irish) and 3% Black African. 37.5% of the ward were Christian, 5.1% Muslim and 4.2% Jewish.

== Education ==
Secondary

- Channing School (private)
- Highgate School (private)
- St Aloysius College (state)

Primary

== Religion ==
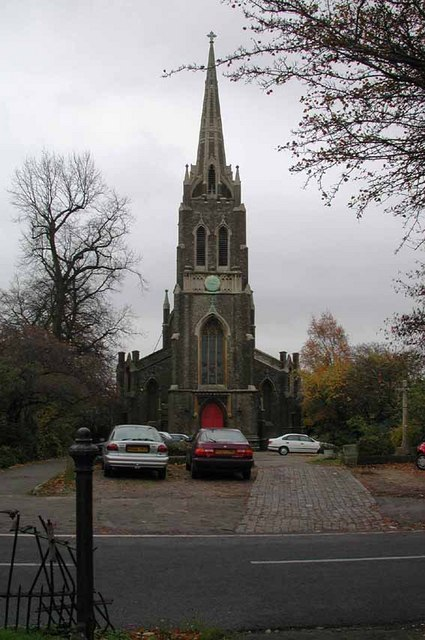
St Michael's Church

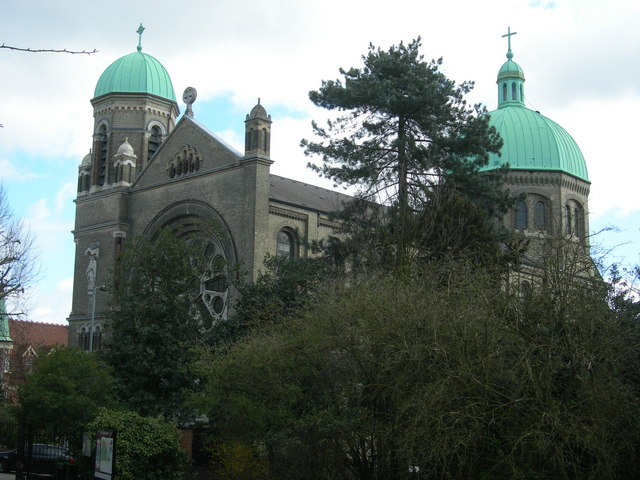
St Joseph's Church

Highgate's main Church of England parish church, St Michael's, is situated close to the summit of the hill and is the highest church in Greater London. It was built as one of the Commissioners' churches in 1831, and was consecrated and opened on 8 November 1832. The architect was Lewis Vulliamy and, in 1831, his original drawings for the church were exhibited at the Royal Academy of Arts.

From the late 17th century until 1830, Ashhurst House, the home of former Lord Mayor of London Sir William Ashhurst, stood on the site of the church. The remains of the house's cellar now form part of the church's crypt. The church's spire, built of Bath stone, with a cross of Portland stone, is a landmark on London's northern skyline. Inside, the chancel and choir stalls were manufactured by G. E. Street in 1880. The pulpit dates from 1848; the present bench pews date from 1879, replacing box pews. The organ is by Hill and Davidson; it was installed in 1885, replacing an earlier instrument of 1842, and was overhauled in 1985.

There is a monument to Samuel Taylor Coleridge and his family, in the form of a slate slab in the middle of the church. The church was damaged in the Second World War by enemy air raids; the present stained glass window at the east end was installed in 1954, replacing a window broken in the Blitz. It is one of the last works by Evie Hone and depicts the Last Supper.

Further down Highgate Hill is the town's Roman Catholic parish church, St Joseph's. It was designed by Albert Vickers and built in 1888, replacing an earlier and smaller church of 1861. Although St Joseph's Church was opened in 1889 by the Bishop of Liverpool, it was not until 1932 that it was officially consecrated, once its debts were cleared. The church has a distinctive copper dome; it has a green patina and its interior was painted by Nathaniel Westlake in 1891. The organ is by William Hill & Sons, installed in 1945 as a memorial to the local victims of the Second World War.

Other places of worship are Highgate United Synagogue and St Augustine's Church.

== Crime ==
On 26 August 1988, Michael Williams, a 43-year-old father from Highgate who worked for the Home Office in Pimlico, disappeared while travelling back home after an employee social. His body was found at Highgate Wood the next day. The case remains unsolved despite being featured heavily in the national press and on the BBC's TV programme Crimewatch.

== Notable inhabitants ==
Highgate Cemetery is the burial place of Communist philosopher Karl Marx, Michael Faraday, Douglas Adams, George Eliot, Jacob Bronowski, Sir Ralph Richardson, Dawn Foster, Christina Rossetti, Sir Sidney Nolan, Alexander Litvinenko, Malcolm McLaren, Radclyffe Hall, Joseph Wolf and singer-songwriter George Michael.

- Adjacent to the cemetery is Holly Lodge Estate, one of only two housing-estates built in the UK for single women; formerly, it was the home and grounds of Baroness Angela Georgina Burdett-Coutts.
- Between 1930 and 1939 Bridget and William Patrick Stuart-Houston, the wife and son of Adolf Hitler's half-brother Alois, lived at 26 Priory Gardens before moving to the United States.
- Singer George Michael owned an £8 million house in Highgate.
- Southend United striker Nile Ranger was born in Highgate.
- Rock star Rod Stewart was born and raised in Highgate.
- Rock star Ray Davies of the Kinks was born and raised in nearby Muswell Hill and lives in Highgate.
- Filmmaker Christopher Nolan was raised in Highgate.
- Actor Jude Law lived in Highgate.
- Actor Robert Powell lives in Highgate.
- Comedian Noel Fielding lives in Highgate.
- Singer Liam Gallagher lives in Highgate.
- Comedians Graham Chapman and Terry Jones of Monty Python lived in Highgate.

Many notable alumni have passed through Highgate School, either Masters or indeed Old Cholmeleians, the name given to old boys of the school. These include T.S. Eliot, who taught the poet laureate John Betjeman there, Gerard Manley Hopkins the poet, the composers John Tavener and John Rutter, John Venn the inventor of Venn diagrams, actor Geoffrey Palmer, Anthony Crosland MP and Labour reformer, and the cabinet minister Charles Clarke.

A blue plaque on a house at the top of North Hill notes that Charles Dickens stayed there in 1832, when he was 20 years old.

Peter Sellers lived in a cottage on 10 Muswell Hill Road as a boy; the house is now marked with a blue plaque. His mother had moved there in order to send him to the Catholic St Aloysius Boys' School in Hornsey Lane.

In Victorian times, St Mary Magdalene House of Charity was a refuge for former prostitutes, named "Fallen Women", where Christina Rossetti was a volunteer from 1859 to 1870. It may have inspired her best-known poem, Goblin Market.

Siouxsie and the Banshees' bassist Steven Severin was born and brought up there.

=== Coleridge ===
In April 1816, the poet, aesthetic philosopher and critic Samuel Taylor Coleridge took residence in the Highgate home of the physician James Gillman at Moreton House in South Grove, as a house patient in order to rehabilitate from his opium addiction. Then in autumn 1823 when Dr Gillman moved to the nearby 3 The Grove, he installed Coleridge in rooms in the top floor, where Coleridge lived for the rest of his life, becoming known as the Sage of Highgate.

Although written years earlier, some of Coleridge's most famous poems were first published while living in Highgate, including "Kubla Khan". His literary autobiography, Biographia Literaria, appeared in 1817. While there, he also became friends with his neighbour Joseph Hardman and his home became a place of pilgrimage for figures such as Carlyle and Emerson. He died there on 25 July 1834 and is buried in the crypt of nearby St Michael's Church. The writer J. B. Priestley subsequently lived in the same house; a commemorative plaque marks the property.

== In popular culture ==
- Highgate's historic feel – in particular, the gothic atmosphere of its cemetery – has provided the backdrop to a considerable number of films, including Hammer Horror films of the 1970s and, more recently, Fantastic Beasts: The Crimes of Grindelwald and Dorian Gray.
- The pub tradition of Swearing on the Horns originated in Highgate.
- In Charles Dickens' novel David Copperfield, James Steerforth lives in a house at the top of Highgate West Hill.
- In the BBC sitcom Are You Being Served?, Mr Lucas (played by Trevor Bannister) lives in Highgate.
- In Robert Galbraith's novel The Ink Black Heart, the central murder occurs in Highgate Cemetery.

== See also ==
- Hornsey (parish)
- Municipal Borough of Hornsey
