= Jewish surname =

Surnames whose bearers are Jews

Jewish surnames are family names used by Jews and those of Jewish origin. Jewish surnames are thought to be of comparatively recent origin; the first known Jewish family names date to the Middle Ages, in the 10th and 11th centuries.

Jews have some of the largest varieties of surnames among any ethnic group, owing to the geographically diverse Jewish diaspora, as well as cultural assimilation and the recent trend toward Hebraization of surnames. Some traditional surnames relate to Jewish history or roles within the religion, such as Cohen ("priest"), Levi ("Levi"), Shulman ("synagogue-man"), Sofer ("scribe"), or Kantor/Cantor ("cantor"), while many others relate to a secular occupation or place names. The majority of Jewish surnames used today developed in the past three hundred years.

== History ==
Historically, Jews used Hebrew patronymic names. In the Jewish patronymic system the first name is followed by ben-, bar- or bat- ("son of" in Hebrew, "son of" in Aramaic and "daughter of," respectively), and then the father's name.

Permanent family surnames only gained popularity among Sephardic Jews in Iberia and elsewhere as early as the 10th or 11th century and did not spread widely to the Ashkenazic Jews of Germany or Eastern Europe until the 18th and 19th centuries, where the adoption of surnames was imposed in exchange for Jewish emancipation. European nations gradually undertook legal endeavors with the aim of enforcing permanent surnames in the Jewish populations. Part of the Alhambra Decree of 1492 contained a provision mandating fixed legal surnames for Sephardic Jews, but it was not until the 18th century that the rest of Europe followed suit. The Kingdom of Prussia began sequentially requiring Jews in its eastern provinces to adopt surnames in the 1790s in an edict affirmed by Napoleon Bonaparte following his invasion of Prussia in 1812. In 1787, Holy Roman Emperor Joseph II promulgated an edict requiring all Jews in Austria to acquire surnames. The Russian Empire mandated the assigning of surnames to Jews by their local community leaders in 1804. France adopted a similar policy in 1808. By the middle of the 19th century, most European Jews had acquired surnames under government pressure.^{:9-10}

Surnames were derived from a variety of sources, such as the personal names of ancestors, place names, and occupations. In the 18th century, a custom developed amongst the Eastern European Jews of the Austro-Hungarian and Russian Empires where surnames began being passed from mother to son as opposed from father to son, but the trend seems to have died out by the early 20th century.

An exception was members of the Cohanim (priestly caste) and Levites (descendants of Levi) who performed certain religious duties, who had always appended the surnames Cohen and Levi respectively (modern spelling in English may vary), which were usually preceded by ha- meaning "the" in Hebrew. These names are seen in many various forms today, all coming from this root. For example, the name Levine in English-speaking countries, the name Löw in Germanic countries and the names Levi, Lévai, or Lévay in Hungary, Europe, or America. Although Ashkenazi Jews now use European or modern-Hebrew surnames for everyday life, the Hebrew patronymic form (ben- or bas-/bat- with the father's name) is still used in Jewish religious and cultural life. It is used in the synagogue and in documents in Jewish law, such as the ketubah (marriage contract).

== Sephardic and Mizrahi Jewish communities ==
Surnames were not unknown among the Jews of the Middle Ages, and as Jews began to mingle more with their fellow citizens, the practice of using or adopting civic surnames in addition to the "sacred" name, used only in religious connections, grew commensurately. Among the Sephardim, this practice was common long before the exile from Spain, and probably became still more common as a result of the example of the Portuguese conversos, who upon adopting Christianity accepted in most cases the family names of their godfathers, or their pre-expulsion Sephardic transliterated names. Among the Ashkenazim, whose isolation from the mainstream majority population in the lands where they lived was more complete, the use of surnames only started to become common in most places in the eighteenth century.

On the other hand, the use of surnames became common very early among the Arabic-speaking Jews, who carried the custom into the Iberian Peninsula (modern Spain and Portugal). Among Sephardi Jews are found such names as Abeldano, corresponding to Ibn el-Danan; Abencabre, corresponding to Ibn Zabara; Tongay is another Sephardi Jewish last name and is derived from the root word Torah (תּוֹרָה) in Hebrew; Avinbruch or Auerbach corresponding to Ibn Baruch; and Beizaee, corresponding to Iza (Hebrew root for "God is perfection").

Hagen corresponds to Hassan or Hazan; and the like. Biblical names often take curious forms in the Iberian records, Isaac appearing as Acaz, Cohen as Coffen or Coffe, Yom-Ṭob as Bondia, Ẓemaḥ as Crescas and/or Cresquez, Pilpel as Pimentel and/or Pimental.

Arias, a patronymic surname, became common throughout the Iberian peninsula. Among the Jews of Spain and Portugal, it had the hidden meaning "the lion of Israel is high above". A well-known Arias was the humanist and Hebraist Benito Arias Montano.

Sephardic Jews who settled in Wallachia, Romania, coming from Trani, Italy, in the 1700s began to adopt Mitrani as their surname with a reference to their city.

The Ḥen family appears to have adopted a translation of the name of their home village, Gracia, near Barcelona. Indeed, among the Sephardi the tendency to adopt family names from localities is largely developed; hence were derived such names as Espinosa, Gerondi, Cavalleria, De La Torre, del Monte, Lousada, and Villa Real. The name Sasportas deserves special attention, as it is really the Balearic dialectal form of La Porta.

Many families, especially among New Christians (Jewish converts to Catholicism) and Crypto-Jews, but not restricted to them, took Spanish and Portuguese family names, sometimes using translations (such as Vidal or de Vidas for Hayyim, Lobos for Zev, de Paz for Shalom, and de la Cruz or Espírito Santo for Ruah); phonetic similarities according to a kinnui-like system, sometimes choosing between already existing ones (such as Pizarro/Pissarro, Mendes, Fonseca, Calle, Fernandes or Rodrígues); even given names (for example, de Jesus or de Miguel). Julio Caro Baroja, supporting José Leite de Vasconcelos' thesis in his "Anthroponymy Portuguesa, 4" argues, for example, that the surnames related to calle (English: "street"), that would be the equivalent in something like a ghetto, are of Jewish origin. This is the case with Alonso Calle, treasurer on the first voyage of Christopher Columbus to the Americas, who was one of the settlers of Sephardic origin who comprised the crew.

Some Sephardic or Hidden/Undeclared Jews for fear of persecution or worse felt compelled to anglicize their names (For example, the original, Italianate Principe thus became Prins in early Amsterdam, and Prince in England or early America later on). Anglicized Sephardic families were also known to have intermixed with similar Christian surname communities and family groupings, often later converting.

The Curiel family is part of these New Christian families that emerge around the time due to persecution. Members adopted the Portuguese last name of Nunes da Costa and the Curiel family were ennobled by João IV of Portugal June 14, 1641.

== Ashkenazi Jewish communities ==
Jews have historically used Hebrew patronymic names. While permanent family surnames started appearing among Sephardic Jews in Iberia and elsewhere as early as the 10th or 11th century, they did not spread widely to the Ashkenazic Jews of Germany or Eastern Europe until later. However, Non-Ashkenazi Jews who had immigrated to what was considered Ashkenaz (such as Sephardic Jews who fled the Inquisition) would often keep their surnames and/or Ashkenazize them (e.g., "Melamad" was kept; "Leoni" would be Ashkenazized to "Leib"), and some of the already-settled Jews in communities in large cities (such as Prague or Frankfurt am Main) began to adopt various surnames.

Matronymic surnames, derived from the name of the matriarch of the family were adopted by many households, see category:Jewish matronymic surnames.

Other surnames came from the man's trade such as Metzger (butcher) or Becker (baker), see #Occupational names and nicknames. A few are derived from personal attributes, such as Joffe (beautiful), or special events in the family history. The majority of Middle Age surname adoption came from place names, see #Toponymic surnames, (for example Shapiro, from Shpira, Speyer, a Rhenanian city known for its famous Jewish community in the 11th century), often a town name, typically the birthplace of the founder of a rabbinical or other dynasty. These names would permutate to various forms as families moved, such as the original Welsch becoming Wallach, Wlock, or Block. Since these surnames did not have the official status that modern ones do, often the old surname would be dropped and a new one adopted after the family moved their household.

Many surnames in the Netherlands derived from the German versions. For example, Waal derived from Wahl and Voorzanger (Chazan) derived from Vorsänger.

The process of assigning permanent surnames to Jewish families (most of which are still used to this day) began in Austria. On July 23, 1787, five years after the Edict of Tolerance, the Holy Roman Emperor Joseph II issued a decree called Das Patent über die Judennamen which compelled the Jews to adopt German surnames. Prussia did so soon after, beginning with Silesia: the city of Breslau in 1790, the Breslau administrative region in 1791, the Liegnitz region in 1794. In 1812, when Napoleon had occupied much of Prussia, surname adoption was mandated for the unoccupied parts; and Jews in the rest of Prussia adopted surnames in 1845.

Napoleon also, in a decree of July 20, 1808, insisted upon the Jews adopting fixed names. His decree covered all lands west of the Rhine; and many other parts of Germany required surname-adoption within a few years. The city of Hamburg was the last German state to complete the process, in 1849.

At the end of the 18th century after the Partition of Poland and later after the Congress of Vienna the Russian Empire acquired a large number of Jews who did not use surnames. They, too, were required to adopt surnames during the 19th century.

== Israel ==
Many immigrants to modern Israel change their names to Hebrew names, to erase remnants of exiled life still surviving in family names from other languages. This phenomenon is especially common among Ashkenazic Jewish immigrants to Israel, because most of their surnames were taken recently, and many were imposed by authorities in Europe as a replacement for the traditional Hebrew patronymic form.

A popular form to create a new family name using Jewish patronymics sometimes related to poetic Zionist themes, such as ben Ami ("son of my people"), or ben Artzi ("son of my country"), and sometimes related to the Israeli landscape, such as bar Ilan ("son of the trees"). Others have created Hebrew names based on phonetic similarity with their original family name: Golda Meyersohn became Golda Meir. A famous person who used an artificial patronymic was the first Israeli Prime Minister, David Ben-Gurion, whose original family name was Grün,"green" in German, but adopted the name "Ben-Gurion" ("son of the lion cub").

== Iran ==
Most of the Jews in Iran had no permanent surnames before Reza Shah. After surnames became mandatory, many Persian Jews employed job related names as their surnames. Many Jews worked in non-Muslim professions like goldsmith, silversmith, dealers of coins, money changing and seller of spirits. Others engaged in medicine, silk manufacturing and weaving, locksmith, tailors, shoe makers, merchants of second hand items. Many other Jews were engaged in jewelry trading, opium and wine manufacturing, musicians, dancers, scavengers, peddlers and other professions that were generally deemed non-respectful.

Many Jews adopted these professions as their surnames, such as Barzegar (the ones in Meybod, Yazd, meaning farmer), Abrishami (silk maker), Almasi (diamond maker), Boloorian (crystal maker), Dehghan (wealthy farmer), Fallah (farmer), Zarrinkoob, Javaherian, Gohari (gold seller), Noghrehforosh (silversmith), Mesforosh (coppersmith), Sarraf, Sarrafan, Sarraf Nezhad, Banki (money changer), Zargar, Zarshenas, Javaheri, Javaherian (goldsmith), Hakakian or Hakkakian (connected with raw material, finished product or implements associated with that trade) for example Roya Hakakian. Jews in Iran also employed the son of or daughter of patronymics, using Persian suffixes such as -pour (son of), -zadeh (born of), -nezhad (from the race of) and -ian (from the group of). Some examples of these names include Davoud pour (son of David), Davoud nezhad (from the seed of David), Davoud zadeh (born of David), Rabbi pour (son of a rabbi), Rabbi zadeh (born of a rabbi), Yaghoub pour (son of Jacob) and Jafar nezhad (from the race of Japhet). Levite and Kohanim surnames became Lavi, Lavaee, Lavi Zadeh, Lavaeeian, Kohan, Kohan pour (son of a Kohen), etc.

Many Persian last names consisted of three parts in order to distinguish from other families with similar last names. Some Persian Jewish families that had similar surnames to their Muslim neighbors added a second surname at the end of their last names. As an example Jafar nezhad Levian (From the race of Japhet and from the Tribe of Levite). The purpose of Levian at the end is to distinguish from Muslim Jafar nezhad (From the race of Japhet).

Many Jews employed the Turkish suffix -chi (meaning "merchant of") to denote their profession. Examples of such include Abrishamchi (silk merchant), Saatchi (watch seller), Talachi (gold seller), Noghrechi (silver seller), Arakchi (merchant of alcoholic drinks), Meschi (copper merchant), Aeenechi (merchant of mirrors), etc.

== Toponymic surnames ==
Many modern Jewish surnames are toponymic surnames, names derived from place names. There are general names like Deutsch, Frank, Franco, Frankel, and more localized ones from almost every European country.

The Netherlands has contributed Leuwarden, Neumegen, Limburg, van Thal, and various other vans, as van Ryn (Rhine), etc.

Germany has contributed the largest number. Some refer to well-known cities as Speyer (in the Middle Ages Spira) (hence Shapira or Shapiro), Posen (hence Posner and Posener, as well as Pozner), Berlin (hence Berliner and Berlinsky), Breslau (anglicised to "Bresslaw"), Bingen, Cassel (cf. David Cassel), Treves (whence, according to some authorities, originated the very popular Alsatian name of Dreyfus), Dresden, Fulda (hence Foulde), and Oppenheim; others, to less familiar towns, like Auerbach, Bischoffsheim, Utting am Ammersee (hence Utting), Hildesheim (Hildesheimer), Landshuth, Sulzberg. House signs such as those in the Frankfurter Judengasse gave rise to the names of some of the best known of Jewish families: Rothschild ("red shield"), Schwarzschild ("black shield"), Adler ("eagle"), Ganz or Gans ("goose"), Strauß ("ostrich"), and Ochs ("ox"). Some names may seem to be derived artificially, but can also refer to towns, e.g., Birnbaum (translated into "Peartree"), Rosenberg, Kornberg, Sommerfeld, Grünberg (hence Greenberg), Goldberg, and Rubinstein/Rubenstein.

The English Crawcour (cf. Siegfried Kracauer) comes from Cracow, while van Praag(h) is the name of a Prague family that settled in the Netherlands before going over to England. The name Gordon may in some cases be derived from the Russian Grodno but is also said to have been adopted by Jews in the Russian Empire in honor of Lord George Gordon (1751–1793), a Scottish nobleman who converted to Judaism in 1787 in Birmingham.

From Poland have come names such as Polano, Pollock, Polack, Polak, Pollak, Poole, Pool, and Polk. The names Altschul or Altschuler are derived from the Altschul ("old school/synagogue") of Prague.

Sephardic surnames, as already mentioned, are almost invariably local, as Almanzi, Arwa and Aruesti (from Hervas), Bejarano (from Bejar), Castro, Carvajal, Espinosa/Spinoza, Silva, Leon, Navarro, Robles, Sevilla (Spanish), and Almeida, Carvallo, Lisbona, Miranda, Paiva, Pimentel, Porto, Pieba and Verdugo (Portuguese). Many Italian names are also of this class, as Alatino, Di Cori (from Cori), Genovese (from Genoa), Meldola, Montefiore, Mortara, Pisa, Rizzolo, Romanelli (with its variants Romanin, Romain, Romayne, and Romanel), Sonnino, Vitalis (from Jaim or Chaim and its variants Vidal, Vidale and Vidas); Verdugo and its variants Berdugo, Bardogo, Paradiso an anagram for the word diaspora (dispersion).

Even in the East there are names of these last two classes, Barron (from BarOn), Galante, Veneziani, though there are a few Arabic names like Alfandari and Ḥaggis; Greek, as Galipapa and Pappo; and a few Turkish, as Jamila, Gungur, Bilbil, and Sabad. Going still farther east, the curious custom which prevails among the Bene Israel may be mentioned of changing Biblical names to similar Hindu names with the addition of -jee, thus Benjamin into Benmajee, Abraham into Abrajee, David into Dawoodjee, Jacob into Akkoobjee.

== Occupational names and nicknames ==
Another frequent source for Jewish and German-Jewish surnames is the names of trades and occupations; such names as Kaufmann and Marchant ("merchant") became prominent. Others of the same kind are: Bialasik, Banks, Brauer, Breyer, and Brower ("brewer"); Spielmann ("musician"); Gerber ("tanner"); Goldschmit (Goldsmith); Silverschmit (Silversmith); Steinschneider ("stonecutter"); Graveur ("engraver"); Shoemark or Schumacher ("shoemaker"); Schuster ("cobbler"); Schneider, Schneiders, and Snyders ("tailor"; in Hebrew חייט, Chait/Khait (and at times Hyatt)); Wechsler ("money-changer"); Zimmermann ("Carpenter"). Related, and likewise generically German, names are derived metonymically for a common object or tool of a profession: e.g., Hammer for a blacksmith, Feder ("quill") for a scribe, and Lein ("linen") for a dealer in cloth; Balsam a dealer in Balsam.

There are other occupational names that are more distinctively related to Jewish culture and religious roles: Dayan (Jewish religious judge in a Beth din); Parnass, Derus, Gabbay, Singer, Cantor, Voorsanger, Chazan, Cantarini, from the synagogue officials who were so called; Shochet, Schaechter, Schechter, from the ritual slaughterer (also Schub or Shub: Hebrew acronym for shochet u-bodek, ritual slaughterer and kosher meat inspector); Shadkun, a marriage-broker; Rabe, Rabinowitz, Rabinovich, Rabinowicz, and Rabbinovitz, rabbis (occasionally Anglicized to Robinson or Robbins); Behar/Bahar, abbreviation of the Hebrew honorific title "ben kavod rabbi," which signifies "son of the honorable rabbi", Benmohel (one variant of which is Mahler), son of one who performed circumcision, the sacred rite of Abraham. A number of Arabic names are of similar origin: Al-Fakhkhar, a potter; Mocatta, a mason or possibly a soldier (Al-Muḳatil).

== See also ==
- German family name etymology
- Hebrew name
- Jewish name
- Jewish name change
- List of Jewish nobility

== General bibliography ==
- Schreiber, Mordecai, ed. (2003). "Names". The Shengold Jewish Encyclopedia. consulting editors Alvin I. Schiff and Leon Klenicki (3rd ed.). Schreiber Publishing. ISBN 978-1-887563-77-2.
- Weiss, Nelly (2002). The origin of Jewish family names: morphology and history. P. Lang. ISBN 978-0-8204-5644-7.
- Eva Horowitz and Heinrich Guggenheimer: Jewish Family Names and their Origins: an etymological dictionary. KTAV 1992, ISBN 978-0-88125-297-2, 882 pages
- What’s in a Name? 25 Jewish Stories. Jewish Museum of Switzerland, Biel 2022. ISBN 978-3-907262-34-4.

=== German Jewish surnames ===
- Lars Menk: A Dictionary of German-Jewish Surnames. Avotaynu, Bergenfield, 2005.
- Franz D. Lucas and Margret Heitmann: Stadt des Glaubens. Olms, 1992, ISBN 978-3-487-09495-3.
- A. Heppner: "Die Stamm-Numeranten". In: Breslauer Juedisches Gemeindeblatt, Amtliches Blatt der Synagogengemeinde zu Breslau. Breslau 1928.
- Leopold Zunz: Namen der Juden: Eine geschichtliche Untersuchung. Leipzig 1837.
- Johann Jakob Schudt: Jüdische Merkwürdigkeiten. Vorstellende, was sich Curieuses ... mit denen ... Juden zugetragen. Frankfurt & Leipzig, 1714–18.

=== Other regions ===
- Alexander Beider: A Dictionary of Jewish Surnames from Galicia. Avotaynu, Bergenfield, 2004, ISBN 1-886223-19-X.
- Alexander Beider: A Dictionary of Jewish Surnames from the Kingdom of Poland. Avotaynu, Bergenfield, 1996, ISBN 0-9626373-9-4.
  - (first edition) Alexander Beider: Jewish Surnames in Prague (15th–18th Centuries). Avotaynu, Bergenfield, 1994, ISBN 978-0-9626373-5-3.
- Alexander Beider: A Dictionary of Jewish Surnames from the Russian Empire: Revised Edition, two volumes. Avotaynu, Bergenfield, 2008, ISBN 1886223386, 10,008 pages
  - First edition: 1993, ISBN 0-9626373-3-5.
