= Paiva =

Paiva may refer to:

== Places ==
=== Brazil ===
- Paiva, Minas Gerais, a municipality
- Engenheiro Rubens Paiva Station, a station on the underground railway system of Rio de Janeiro
- Estádio José Duarte de Paiva, a multi-use stadium in Sete Lagoas
- Estádio Gustavo Paiva, a multi-use stadium in Maceió

=== Portugal ===
- Castelo de Paiva, a town and municipality
- Vila Nova de Paiva, a municipality
- Paiva River, a river in north-east Portugal (a tributary of the river Douro)

=== Uruguay ===
- Estadio Atilio Paiva Olivera, a multi-use stadium in Rivera, Uruguay

== Other uses ==
- Paiva (surname), a Portuguese toponymic surname
- Paiva (plant genus), a former genus in the family Rubiaceae
- Hôtel de la Païva, a hôtel particulier in Paris
