= Arouca 516 =

Suspension bridge in Norte, Portugal

Arouca 516 516 Arouca
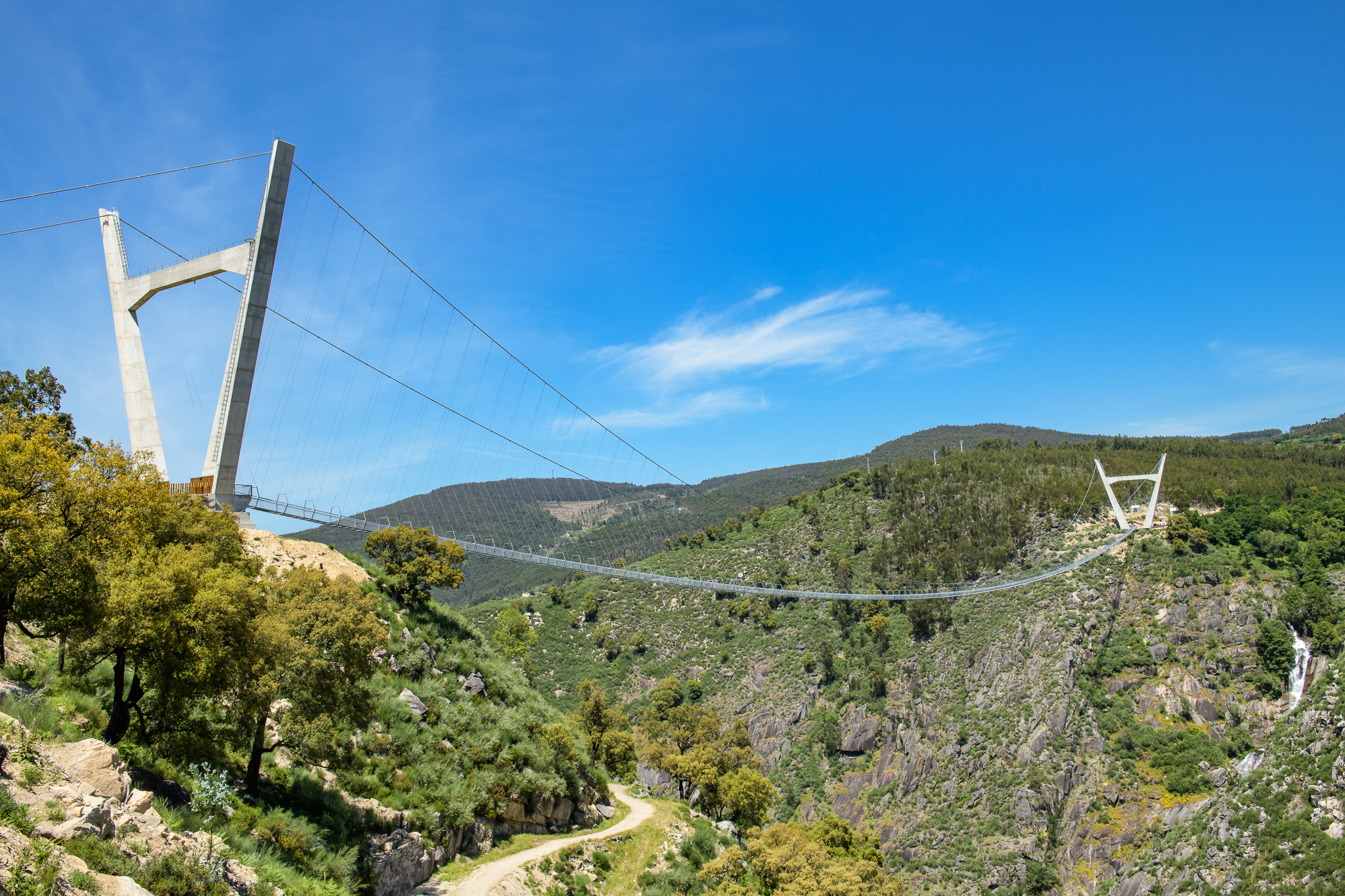
- Coordinates: 40°57′51.84″N 8°10′31.12″W
- Carries: Walkway
- Crosses: Paiva River
- Locale: Arouca, Aveiro District, Portugal
- Website: 516arouca.pt/en

Characteristics
- Design: Suspension bridge
- Material: Steel
- Total length: 516 m (1,693 ft)
- Width: 1.2 m (3 ft 11 in)
- Height: 176 m (577 ft)
- No. of lanes: 1

History
- Contracted lead designer: Itecons
- Constructed by: Conduril - Engenharia SA
- Construction start: July 2020
- Opened: 29 April 2021; 4 years ago
- Inaugurated: 2 May 2021; 4 years ago

Arouca 516 is one of the world's longest pedestrian suspension bridges, located in the municipality of Arouca, in the North Region and the Aveiro District of Portugal. The bridge has a length of 516 m (1,693 ft). It is suspended 175 m (574 ft) above the Paiva River, which it spans. Its name is a reference to its extension in meters and the municipality where it is located.

Its length exceeds by 16 m (52 ft) the Charles Kuonen Suspension Bridge in Switzerland, opened on 29 July 2017, by about 500 m (1,600 ft).

Construction of the bridge started in May 2018. It opened on 29 April 2021 to residents of the municipality and on 2 May to the general public, with prior purchase of tickets online. Access to the bridge is possible either from Canelas or Alvarenga and a guide always accompanies visitor groups. The first person to cross the bridge was Hugo Xavier.

The bridge was designed by the Portuguese research institution Itecons and constructed by Conduril Engenharia, S.A., at a cost of approximately €2.3 million.

== See also ==
- List of notable pedestrian bridges
