= Arouca =

Arouca may refer to:

== Places ==
=== Portugal ===
- Arouca, Portugal, a municipality and a town in the Metropolitan Area of Porto, Portugal
- Arouca Abbey, former Cistercian monastery from the 10th century
- Arouca 516, a suspension bridge located in the municipality of Arouca

=== Trinidad and Tobago ===
- Arouca, Trinidad and Tobago, a town in Regional Corporation of Tunapuna-Piarco
- Arouca River, a tributary of the Caroni River

== Other uses ==
- Arouca (footballer) (born 1986), Brazilian footballer
- F.C. Arouca, a Portuguese football club
