= Paiva (surname) =

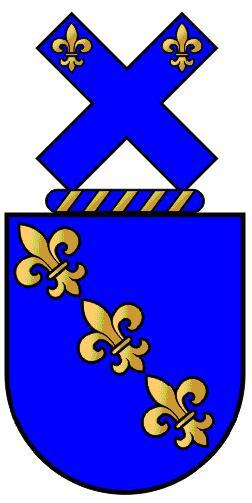
- Arms of the chief of the name Paiva
- Language: Portuguese

Origin
- Word/name: Toponymic (Castelo de Paiva, Portugal)

Paiva is a Portuguese toponymic surname derived from the valley of the river Paiva in northern Portugal, today the municipality of Castelo de Paiva. Bearers of the name are found across the Portuguese-speaking world, especially in Brazil, and the surname has several noble and armorial branches.

== Etymology ==
The toponym Paiva is pre-Roman in origin, from an older hydronym referring to the river and its valley.

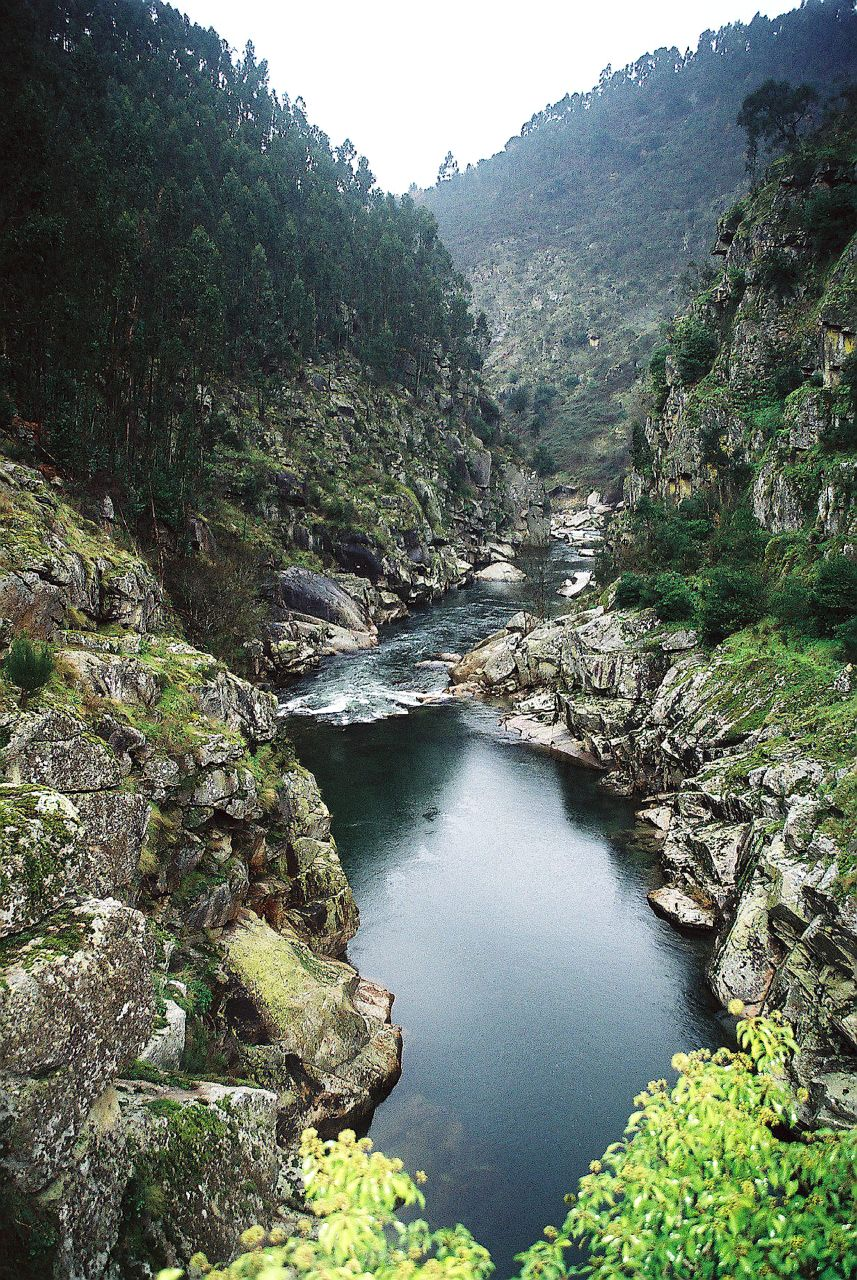
River Paiva in Alvarenga

One scholarly hypothesis reconstructs Paiva as <*pis + *wa> (with *-awa/*-ava a common hydronymic element meaning "water, river"). This would make Paiva comparable to other water-based toponyms throughout Europe, such as Drava and Sava (the same *-ava/*-awa hydronymic element in the Balkans), and also to British names like Avon (from Celtic *abonā*, “river”) or Don (from *Dānu*), which, although reflecting local Celtic developments (-on/-ona), share the same Old-European practice of forming river-names by combining a water-root with a hydronymic suffix.

== Place and history: Castelo de Paiva ==
The modern town of Castelo de Paiva (Aveiro District) occupies the valley of the Paiva river and is the locus of the medieval toponymic origin of the surname. The town shows evidence of ancient settlement (megalithic, Roman remains) and a medieval castle. It received a foral from D. Manuel I in the early sixteenth century.

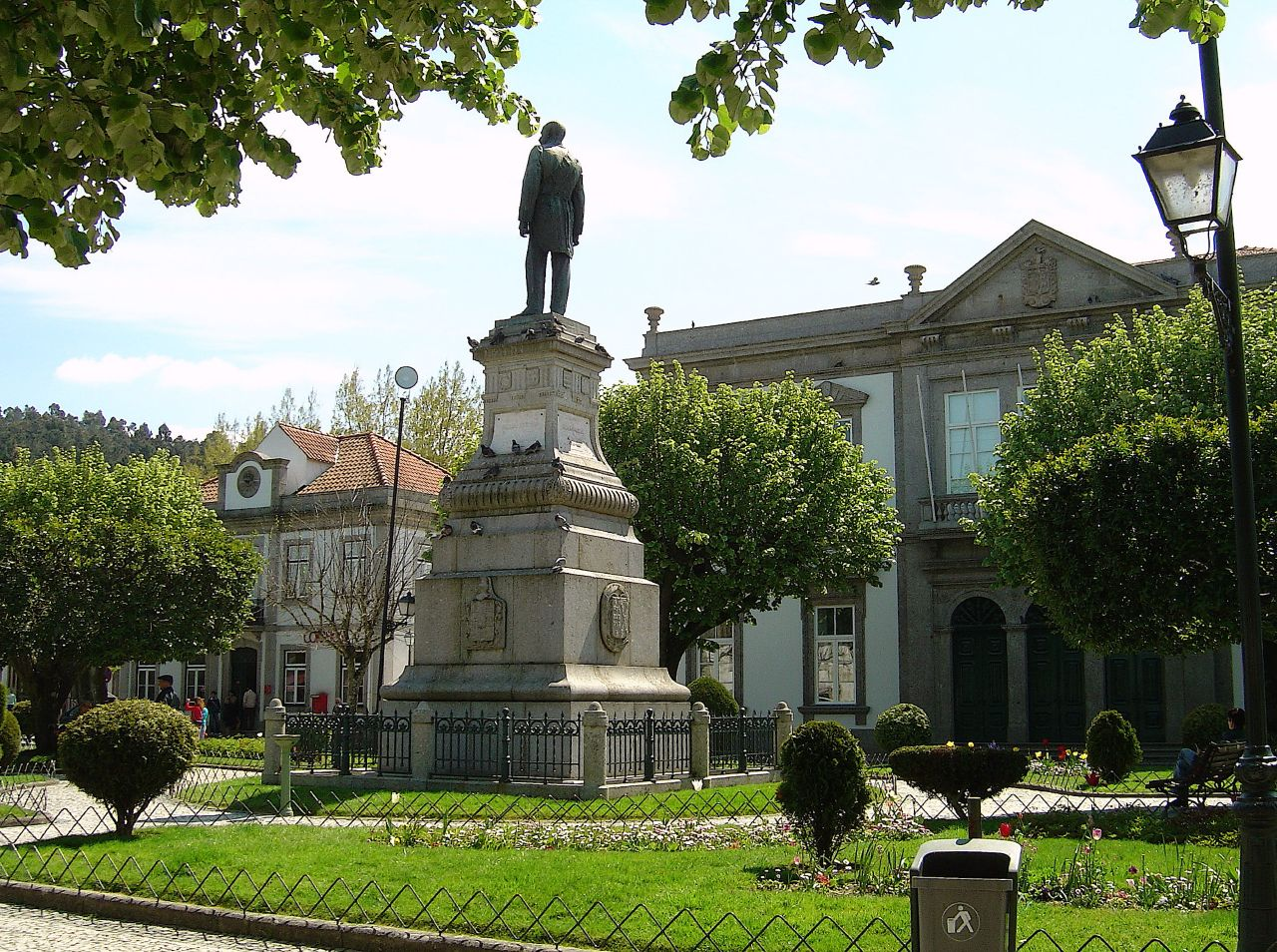
Castelo de Paiva - Portugal

== Pre-Roman peoples and ethnography ==
Pliny the Elder records the existence of a people called the Paesuri (Paisuri, Paisicacoi) in the Douro–Vouga region, the same broad area that later contains the Paiva valley.

The linguistic classification of the Paesuri is debated: earlier authors linked them with the Lusitani; modern scholarship variously describes their speech as Lusitanian, para-Celtic, or “celtoid,” based on onomastics and inscriptions.

== Family history and nobility ==
The first recorded bearer of the name is traditionally given as Dom Arnaldo de Baião (or de Bayonne), an 11th-century noble whose descendants took the name and title de Paiva after establishing lordship in the valley. His descendants are given as Trutesendo (Trocosendo) and Pedro Trutesendes de Baião, followed by Paio Pires (Romeu) de Paiva, who is among the first to carry the toponymic de Paiva. From Paio Pires came Soeiro Pais "o Mouro" de Paiva, and then João Soares de Paiva (c. 1140–after 1194), a documented troubadour and landholder. This sequence, while partly traditional in its earliest generations, is accepted in standard genealogical works and establishes the transmission of the surname Paiva in the male line by the twelfth century.

Genealogical compendia trace numerous armigerous descendants to this lineage. Later noble branches held titles such as Baron and Viscount of Castelo de Paiva, and Viscount of Paiva Manso, among others.

== Arms ==
The chief arms of Paiva are blazoned: Azure, three fleurs-de-lis Or in bend; crest: a saltire Azure with two fleurs-de-lis Or at the tips. These are borne (often quartered or as partitions) by descendants with documented ancestry to the noble line. The 16th-century depiction of the Livro da Nobreza e Perfeiçam das Armas includes a different crest, also with a saltire Azure, but surmounted by a single fleur-de-lys Or, the base of the fleur-de-lys resting on the intersection of the saltire and the upper petal extending between the upper arms.

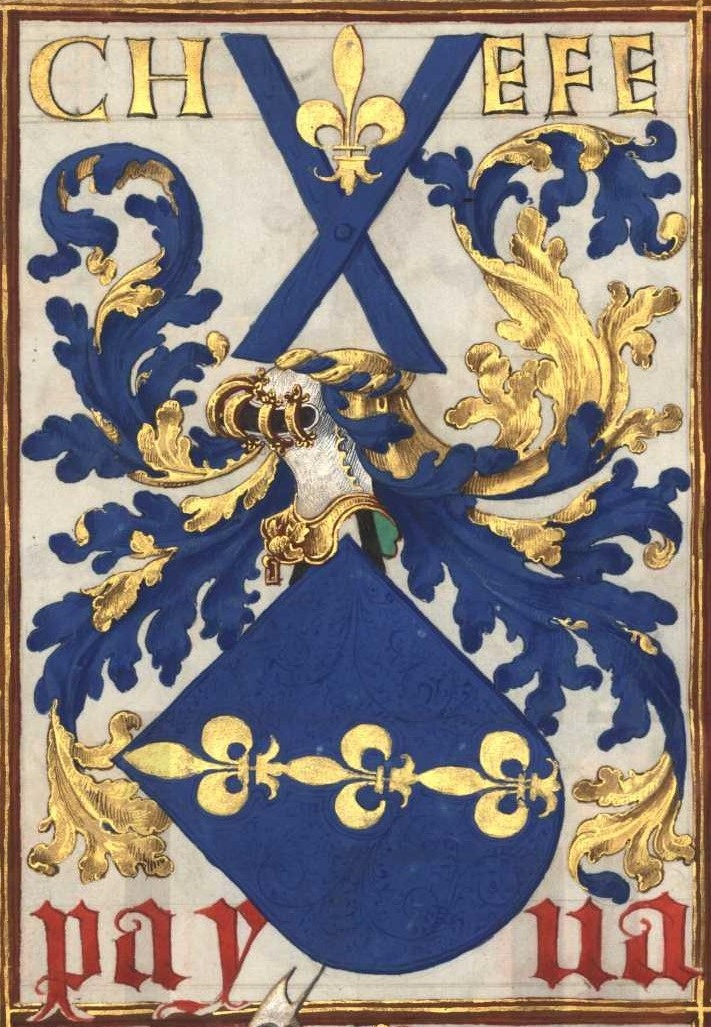
Livro da Nobreza e Perfeiçam das Armas, fol. 27v (detail)

== Distribution ==
Modern surname-distribution databases show that Paiva is particularly numerous in Brazil, followed by Portugal and Lusophone Africa. It is not among the most common surnames in Portugal but is a well-established name with significant representation.

== People ==
- Adriano de Paiva (1847–1907), Portuguese scientist, a pioneer of the telectroscope
- Afonso de Paiva (c. 1443-c. 1490), Portuguese diplomat and explorer of Ethiopia
- Alexandre Paiva (born 1967), Brazilian jiu-jitsu athlete
- Ana Paiva, Portuguese professor
- Antonia Maury (Antonia Caetana de Paiva Pereira Maury, 1866-1952), American astronomer
- Antônio Carlos Paiva (born 1968), Brazilian Roman Catholic bishop
- Antonio da Costa Paiva (1806-1879), Portuguese botanist, naturalist, doctor, teacher and nobleman
- Brittni Paiva (born 1988), American musician, songwriter and music producer
- Bueno de Paiva (1861-1928), Brazilian politician
- Diego Andrada de Payva (Diogo de Paiva de Andrada, 1528–75), Portuguese theologian
- Esther Paiva (1819-1884), Russian-born French courtesan and salon-holder
- Eunice Paiva (1929-2018), Brazilian lawyer
- Félix Paiva (1877-1965), President of Paraguay
- Fernanda de Paiva Tomás (1928-1984), Portuguese communist activist
- Filipe Paiva (born 1991), Portuguese footballer
- Gil (footballer, born September 1987) (1987–2016), Brazilian footballer
- Heliodoro de Paiva (fl. 1552), Portuguese Renaissance composer
- Henrique Mitchell de Paiva Couceiro (1861-1944), Portuguese military officer, statesman, and politician
- James DePaiva (born 1957), American actor
- João Soares de Paiva (c. 1140 – after 1200/16), Portuguese troubadour
- João Vasco Paiva (born 1979), Portuguese-born Hong Kong–based contemporary artist
- José Pinto Paiva (1938–2024), Brazilian chess master
- Juan Paiva (born 1998), Brazilian actor
- Juliana Paiva (born 1993), Brazilian actress
- Kassie DePaiva (born 1961), American soap opera actress and singer
- La Païva (Esther Lachmann, 1819–1884), Parisian courtesan; married briefly to Albino de Araújo de Paiva.
- Loick Pires (Loick Barros Paiva Pires, born 1989), Portuguese footballer playing in the UK
- Luna Paiva (born 1980), Argentine visual artist
- M. Teresa Paiva-Weed (born 1959), American attorney and politician
- Manuel de Paiva Boléo (1904–1992), Portuguese philologist and linguist.
- Marcelo Rubens Paiva (born 1959), Brazilian writer
- Marco Paiva (born 1973), Portuguese football defensive midfielder and manager
- Nestor Paiva (1905–1966), American actor
- Rafael Paiva (born 1984), Brazilian football coach
- Raulian Paiva (born 1995), Brazilian mixed martial artist
- Renato Paiva (born 1970), Portuguese football manager
- Ricardo Tavarelli (Ricardo Javier Tavarelli Paiva, born 1970), Paraguayan footballer
- Rubens Paiva (1929–1971), Brazilian civil engineer and politician
- Shaye de Paiva (born 2000), Canadian national team rower
- Silvinho (footballer, born 1958), Brazilian footballer
- Tomás Ribeiro Paiva (born 1960), Brazilian army general
- Valeria de Paiva, Brazilian mathematician, logician and computer scientist
- Vinícius Paiva (born 2001), Brazilian footballer
- Wanderley Paiva (1946–2023), Brazilian professional football coach and player
