= Mortara =

Mortara may refer to:

- Mortara, Lombardy, a town in Italy
- Mortara (surname)
- Mortara Instrument, an American manufacturer of electrocardiograph machines, acquired by Hill-Rom
- Mortara Center for International Studies at Georgetown University
