= Nancy Pearlman =

American broadcaster, environmentalist, college instructor and TV producer

Nancy Sue Pearlman (born 1948) is an American broadcaster, environmentalist, college instructor and TV producer. She was honoured on the Global 500 Roll of Honour of the United Nations Environment Programme in 1989.

== Education ==
She was born in Huntington, West Virginia, daughter of the physician Carl Kenneth Pearlman and the writer and lecturer Agnes Emma Branch Pearlman. Her parents had the Pearlman Mountain Cabin in Idyllwild designed by John Lautner. Her brother Philip Branch Pearlman, a musician, took the surname Gadhan and was father of Adam Yahiye Gadahn.

Pearlman Mountain Cabin, site plan

Pearlman attended Chapman University from 1966 to 1968, which included two semesters with Chapman's World Campus Afloat (now Semester at Sea) program. She then spent a year at Los Angeles City College before joining University of California, Los Angeles in 1969, earning her Bachelor of Arts in Anthropology in 1971. That year she founded Concerned Bicycle Riders for the Environment. She cycled wearing a gas mask to protest against smog, and the group organised a "Pollution Solution" bike ride for 1,500, lobbying for bikeways.

Pearlman received her secondary teaching credential at University of Southern California and finally a Master of Arts in Urban Planning with an Environmental Studies Specialty at Antioch University in 1979–1980.

== Environmental projects and media ==
Since 1970, when she helped organize Earth Day in Southern California, Pearlman has collaborated with many environmental and conservation groups.

Pearlman has been from 1971 Executive Director of Educational Communications Inc. It supplies radio and television programs on the environment. She is the host and producer its long-running environmental radio and television programs, Environmental Directions and ECONEWS. ECONEWS was described in 1988 as "the only comprehensive weekly environmental report on TV." On overpopulation, Pearlman interviewed Paul R. Ehrlich for Environmental Directions in 1989, and Anne H. Ehrlich in 1992. Speakers on Environmental Directions on 27 February 2002 were Tom Snyders the Bicycling Comedian, and the activist Michael Novick, publisher of the "Turning the Tide" newsletter.

In 1972, Pearlman founded the Ecology Center of Southern California, as a regional conservation organisation and clearinghouse. Her other ecological activities have included founding Project Ecotourism (1993), and Campus Greening (1994).

Pearlman founded, and edited with Lynn Cason, the quarterly Directory of Environmental Organizations. She also edited the bimonthly Compendium Newsletter.

== Community college campaign ==
In California, Nancy Pearlman served in Seat 6 of the Board of Trustees Los Angeles Community College, for 16 years. The Los Angeles Times in 2017 described her role there as that of a "gadfly", "persistently challenging the board and district administrators."

Pearlman was first elected in 2001. Having lost a re-election campaign on March 7, 2017, she entered a special election to fill Seat 7 on the Los Angeles Community College Board of Trustees. On November 8, 2022, she lost the special general election. In November 2024, Nancy Pearlman intends to run for Seat 3.

== Family ==
Pearlman married in 1972 the environmental lobbyist Joseph Tasker Edmiston (born 1948), son of Tasker Lee Edmiston and his wife Beula Viola Bates. The marriage ended in divorce, around 1976. Tasker Lee Edmiston (1910–2004) was a conservationist, and he and his family were involved in founding the Edmund C. Jaeger Nature Sanctuary (see Edmund Jaeger) and the Desert Lily Sanctuary.
