= Berlinski =

Berlinski (or Berliński in its native Polish form) is a surname. Notable people with the surname include:

- Claire Berlinski (born 1968), American writer and journalist
- David Berlinski (born 1942), American philosopher, educator and writer
- Herman Berlinski (1910–2001), German-born American composer, organist, musicologist and choir conductor
- Hirsch Berlinski (1908–1944), Polish resistance fighter
- Mischa Berlinski (born 1973), American writer
- Rafał Berliński (born 1976), Polish footballer
- Ron Berlinski (born 1994), German footballer

== See also ==
- Berlinsky
