= Corrado Augias =

Italian journalist, writer and television presenter (1935–2026)

Corrado Augias OMRI
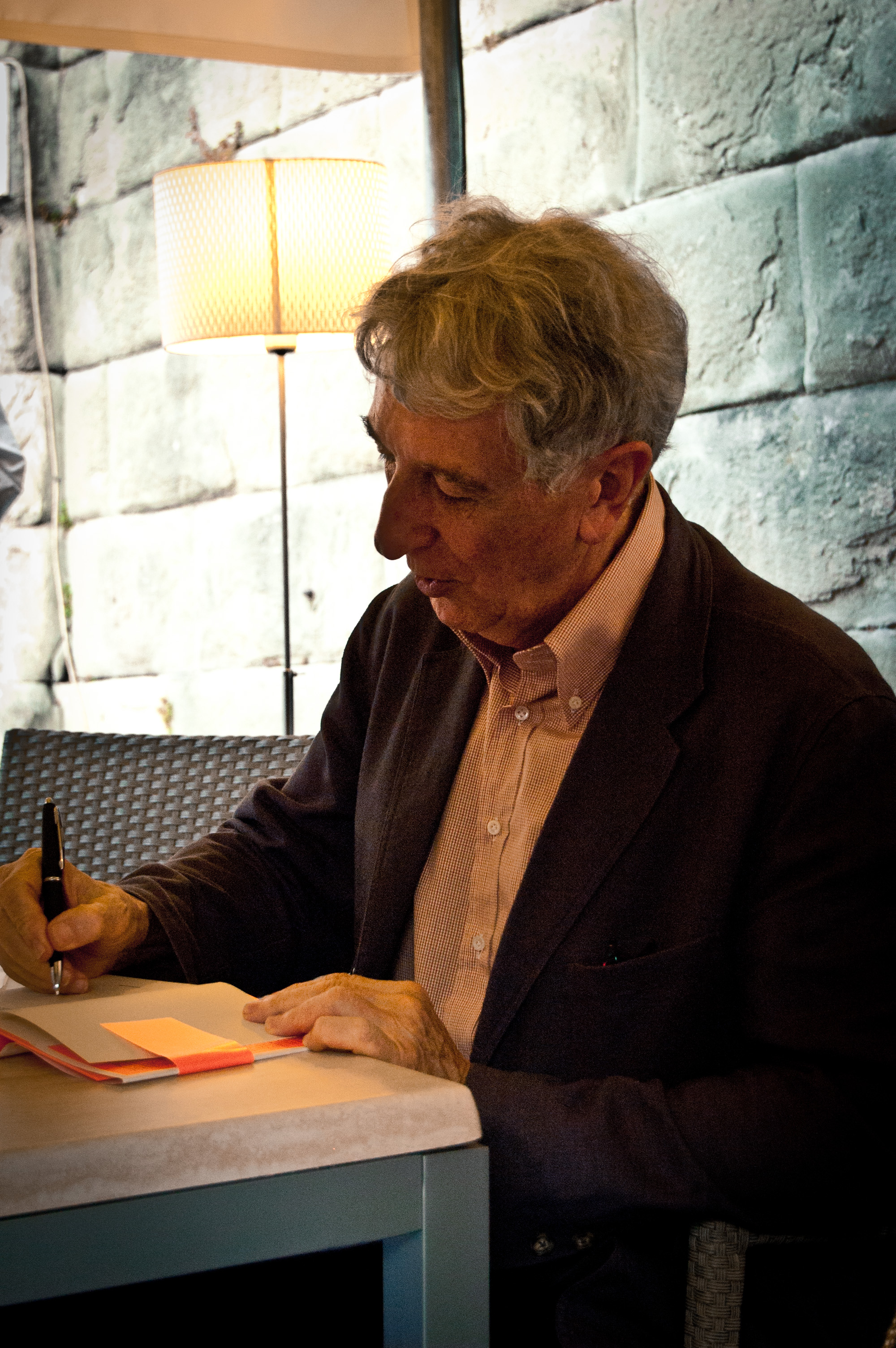
- Augias in 2010
- Born: 26 January 1935; Rome, Kingdom of Italy
- Died: 19 November 2026 (aged 91); Rome, Italy
- Education: Sapienza University of Rome
- Occupation: Journalist
- Notable work: Telefono giallo, Enigma
- Height: 1.80 m (5 ft 11 in)
- Political party: Democratic Party of the Left

Member of the European Parliament
- In office 19 July 1994 – 19 July 1999
- Constituency: Southern Italy

Corrado Augias (Italian pronunciation: [korˈraːdo ˈaudʒas]; 26 January 1935 – 19 November 2026) was an Italian journalist, writer and TV host. He was also a member of the European Parliament from 1994 to 1999 for the Democratic Party of the Left.

== Biography ==
Augias was born and raised in Rome in a family of French (from Toulon) and more ancestrally Sardinian origin on his father's side, an air force officer, and of Jewish origin on that of his mother. He became popular in Italy as the host of several shows dealing with mysteries and cases of the past, such as Telefono giallo and Enigma. In 2023, he moved from Rai to La7.

As writer, Augias issued a series of crime novels set in the early 20th century and others. His other works include several essays about peculiar features of some cities around the world: I segreti di ("The Secrets of...") Rome, Paris, New York City and London. In 2006, in collaboration with scholar Mauro Pesce, he published a work dealing with the gospel's description of the life of Jesus (Inchiesta su Gesù), which became a bestseller in Italy. The book elicited many reactions, for example Pietro Ciavarella and Valerio Bernardi wrote Risposta a Inchiesta su Gesù, aiming to provide "informed and constructive apologetics".

In 2010 he published I segreti del Vaticano (i.e. The Secrets of the Vatican"), in which he deals with issues of power involving the Vatican state.

As a journalist, Augias worked for La Repubblica, L'Espresso and Panorama. He was also a playwright. He was an atheist.

In December 2020, he renounced his Chevalier (Knight) title of the French Legion of Honour, after the decoration was also awarded to Egyptian president Abdel Fattah el-Sisi, who was in charge at the time of the killing of Italian citizen Giulio Regeni.

== Works ==
- Il disagio della libertà. Perché agli italiani piace avere un padrone, Milan, Rizzoli, 2012. ISBN 978-88-17-05507-9; presented on July 5, 2012, at Villa del Vascello, Rome, by the library service of the Grand Orient of Italy.

== Electoral history ==
Election	House	Constituency	Party	Votes	Result
1994	European Parliament	Southern Italy	PDS	168,735	Elected
1999	European Parliament	Southern Italy	DS	48,529	Not elected

== Honours ==
- Italy: Knight Grand Cross of the Order of Merit of the Italian Republic (4 May 2006)
- France: Chevalier of the Legion of Honour (2007); renounced on 14 December 2020

== See also ==
- 75225 Corradoaugias, asteroid
