= Pedro Costa (footballer, born 1981) =

Portuguese footballer

Personal information
- Full name: Pedro Miguel de Castro Brandão Costa
- Date of birth: 21 November 1981 (age 44)
- Place of birth: Arouca, Portugal
- Height: 1.68 m (5 ft 6 in)
- Position: Right-back

Youth career
- 1993–1996: Arouca
- 1996–2000: Boavista

Senior career*
Years	Team	Apps	(Gls)
2000–2002	Boavista	5	(0)
2000–2001	→ Gondomar (loan)	27	(0)
2001–2002	→ Famalicão (loan)	20	(0)
2002–2005	Braga B	38	(0)
2003–2007	Braga	37	(0)
2007–2011	Académica	60	(0)
2011–2012	Arouca	4	(0)
2012–2015	Boavista	34	(0)
Total		225	(0)

International career
1996–1998	Portugal U16	12	(0)
1998	Portugal U17	5	(0)
1999–2000	Portugal U18	12	(0)
2001	Portugal U20	1	(0)
- * Club domestic league appearances and goals

Pedro Miguel de Castro Brandão Costa (born 21 November 1981) is a Portuguese former professional footballer who played mainly as a right-back.

== Club career ==
Costa was born in Arouca, Aveiro District. A product of Boavista's youth system that still appeared with modest Gondomar S.C. and F.C. Famalicão in his early years as a senior, he joined Primeira Liga club S.C. Braga in the 2002–03 campaign. He made his first-team debut on 26 April 2003, featuring the full 90 minutes in a 1–3 home loss against S.L. Benfica.

After only 37 league appearances for Braga over five seasons – he was also regularly utilised by the reserves in the third division during his stint – Costa moved to Associação Académica de Coimbra for the 2007–08 season. Again mainly used as a backup with the Students, he appeared on both sides of the defensive sector when called upon, playing a career-best with the professionals 22 games in his second year as the team finished in seventh position.

In June 2011, after having appeared in 11 league matches in the season (13 overall), 30-year-old Costa left Académica and signed for F.C. Arouca in the Segunda Liga, where he started playing football as a youngster.
