= Rubenstein =

Rubenstein is a surname. It comes from German and Yiddish, where it means "ruby-stone". Notable people with the name include:

- Alan Rubenstein, British businessman
- Atoosa Rubenstein (born 1972), Iranian-American journalist and editor-in-chief of Seventeen magazine
- David Rubenstein, American co-founder of The Carlyle Group and one of the richest people in the United States
- Deidre Rubenstein (born 1948), Australian actress
- E. Ivan Rubenstein (1895–1955), American lawyer and judge
- Glenn Rubenstein (born 1976), American journalist
- Jacob Leon Rubenstein, birth name of Jack Ruby, American murderer of Lee Harvey Oswald
- James M. Rubenstein (born 1949), American geographer and author
- Louis Rubenstein (1861–1931), Canadian world champion and Hall of Fame figure skater
- Maggi Rubenstein (1930-2024), American sexologist and activist for bisexual rights
- Mary-Jane Rubenstein (born 1977), American philosopher of religion and science
- Meridel Rubenstein (born 1948), American photographer and installation artist
- Richard L. Rubenstein (1924–2021), American university president and author of theology
- Richard E. Rubenstein (born 1938), American author of historical works
- Shaun Rubenstein (born 1983), South African World Marathon champion canoer
- Steven Rubenstein (1962–2012), American anthropologist
- William Rubenstein (born 1960), American Harvard Law School professor

== See also ==
- Rubinstein, surname
