= Snyders (surname) =

Snyders is a surname. Notable people with the surname include:

- Frans Snyders (1579–1657), Flemish painter
- Glenn Snyders (born 1987), New Zealand swimmer
- Sam Snyders, Canadian actor
- Tom Snyders, American comedian

== See also ==
- Snyder (surname)
