= Democrata Futebol Clube =

Brazilian association football team

Democrata de Sete Lagoas
- Full name: Democrata Futebol Clube
- Nickname: Jacaré (Alligator)
- Founded: 14 June 1914; 111 years ago
- Ground: Arena do Jacaré
- Capacity: 20,000
- Head Coach: Paulinho Guará
- League: Campeonato Mineiro Módulo II
- 2025: Mineiro Módulo II, 3rd of 12
Home colours	Away colours	Third colours

Democrata Futebol Clube, also referred to as Democrata de Sete Lagoas, Democrata-SL or just Democrata, is a Brazilian association football team from the city of Sete Lagoas in Minas Gerais state.

== History ==
People who frequented the popular Bar Chique desired to found a sporting club in the city. After meeting from June 9 to June 13 of 1914, to discuss the concept. The group scheduled a meeting to the following day to decide the foundation details. The club was founded on 14 June of that year and named Democrata Futebol Clube. The club's first president was Francisco Wanderley Azevedo.

Democrata played their first match on 6 September 1914, against another Minas Gerais state club. They beat Matozinhos city's Ordem e Progresso 4–1.

== Stadium ==
The club plays its home matches at Joaquim Henrique Nogueira stadium, nicknamed Nogueirão and Arena do Jacaré, and inaugurated on 26 January 2006. It has a maximum capacity of approximately 18,000 people. The old stadium, José Duarte de Paiva, which had a maximum capacity of approximately 7,000 people, is now inactive.

== Honours ==
- Campeonato Mineiro
  - Runners-up (3): 1955, 1957, 1963
- Campeonato Mineiro Módulo II
  - Winners (2): 1981, 2022
- Torneio Início do Campeonato Mineiro
  - Winners (1): 2006

== Noted head coaches ==
Vanderlei Luxemburgo, who coached the Brazil national football team from 1998 to 2000 and coached Real Madrid of Spain in 2004 and in 2005, was the head coach of Democrata in 1985 and in 1986.

== Club's colors ==
The club's colors are red and white. Its home kit is composed of a red and white vertical striped shirt, white short and white socks.

Democrata's first kit was ordered from a Rio de Janeiro company, by telegraph and arrived on 25 June, transported by train.

== Mascot ==
The club's mascot is a yacare caiman, because it is one of the most agile animals in the Brazilian fauna. The mascot is sometimes depicted as an anthropomorphic animal wearing the club's kit.

== Anthem ==
Democrata's anthem was composed by Elson Corrêa Barbosa (both the lyrics and the song). Ary Pires was responsible for the arrangement.
