= Canelas (Arouca) =

Former civil parish in Arouca, Portugal

Coordinates: 40°58′20″N 8°12′01″W

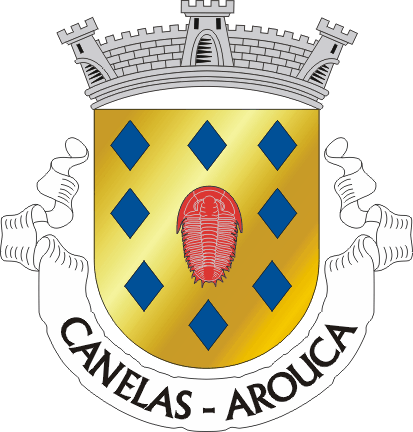
Coat of Arms of Canelas

Canelas is a former civil parish, located in the municipality of Arouca, Portugal. In 2013, the parish merged into the new parish Canelas e Espiunca. In 2001 it had an area of 20.89 km^{2}, a population of 864 and a population density of 41.4 inhabitants/km^{2}.

Canelas has been part of Arouca since 1843. Before this, it was part of the community of Alvarenga. It includes Gamarão de Baixo, Gamarão de Cima, Mealha, Vilarinho, Estreitinha, Canelas de Baixo, and Canelas de Cima.

== Notable people ==
- Maurício Esteves Pereira Pinto (1924-1975) -physician
