= Castro of Monte Valinhas =

- Castro de Monte Valinhas

General information
- Type: Castro
- Architectural style: Neolithic
- Location: Santa Eulália, Arouca, Portugal
- Coordinates: 40°56′11.39″N 8°16′3.86″W

Technical details
- Material: Granite

The Castro of Monte Valinhas, alternately the Castro of São João de Valinhas, is an archaeological site in Portugal, in the civil parish of Santa Eulália, in the municipality of Arouca, notable for the discovery of important traces of human remains from the last 2000 years.

== History ==
Its situation, overlooking the open-spaces in the valley, was used by successive communities throughout the centuries (since the Neolithic until the Middle Ages) for protection and defence.

Although some artifacts may have indicated a presence since the Bronze Age, the reality is that there has not been any correspondent confirmation beyond the Iron Age. It was in this period that a defensive structure (castro) was established over Monte Valinhas, as well as along the southern and southeastern flanks, taking advantage of the granite rocks that exist there.

Later, during the Roman period, the area was reoccupied, possibly after the 1st century: artifacts that include fragments of ceramics and glass, lithics and metals were discovered during archaeological investigations.

Its strategic location attracted early settlers, but more important, medieval settlement during the Reconquista era, who utilized the hilltop and built a castle that lasted until the late 12th century or early 13th century, when it was abandoned.

Archaeological study of the area began at the end of the 1980s, by a team of investigators coordinated by António Manuel Silva, whom identified the walled compound. These studies also concluded the investigations into the circular castro structure, discovering a fireplace in one of the human residences. The site remains unclassified, and under study since 1996.

== Architecture ==
The Castro of Monte Valinhas was erected on the hilltop of the same name (Monte Valinhas) within the parish of Santa Eulália, in a privileged strategic space over the valley of Arouca.
