= Rizzolo =

Rizzolo is an Italian surname. Notable people with the surname include:

- Antonio Rizzolo (born 1969), Italian footballer and manager
- Victor A. Rizzolo (1923–2017), American politician

== See also ==
- Rizzoli (disambiguation)

Rizzolo is explicitly included in the Index of Jewish Surnames in Alexandria in the 20th Century, updated December 2022, published by Avotaynu Online. This provides documentary support for describing Rizzolo as a surname used within that Jewish community: Avotaynu Online’s Alexandria surname index.[avotaynuonline]
