= Van Praag =

Van Praag (Dutch pronunciation: [vɑm ˈpraːx]) is a surname of Dutch origin, meaning "from Prague". The surname Van Praag is also common among Dutch Jews. Notable people with the surname include:

- Bernard van Praag (born 1939), Dutch economist professor
- Henri van Praag (1916–1988), Dutch educator, philosopher, and theologian
- Herman van Praag (born 1929), Dutch psychiatrist
- Jaap van Praag (1910–1987), Dutch football administrator
- Jaap van Praag (1911–1981), Dutch humanist professor
- Lionel Van Praag (1908–1987), Australian motorcycle speedway champion
- Louis van Praag (1926–1993), British industrial designer
- Marga van Praag (born 1946), Dutch journalist
- Menna van Praag (born 1978), British author
- Michael van Praag (born 1947), Dutch football administrator
- Raphaël van Praag (1885–1934) Belgian football referee and official, and sports journalist
- Siegfried van Praag (1899–2002), Dutch author

== See also ==
- Van Praagh
