= Gerondi =

Gerondi (Hebrew: גירונדי) is a Jewish surname that indicates the origin of the bearer of the name or family in the city of Girona, Catalonia. Notable people with the surname include:

- Moshe ben Nahman Gerondi (1194–1270), Spanish rabbi, philosopher, physician, kabbalist, and biblical commentator
- Nissim Gerondi (1290–1376), influential talmudist and authority on Jewish law
- Peretz Gerondi (late 13th century), Iberian kabbalist and rabbi
- Yonah Gerondi (1180–1264), Catalan rabbi and moralist
- Zerahiah Gerondi (early 12th century), Torah and Talmud commentator and a poet
