= Van Praagh =

Van Praagh is a surname. Notable people with the surname include:

- James Van Praagh (born 1958), American writer
- Peggy van Praagh (1910–1990), English dancer and choreographer
- Stella Van Praagh, pediatric cardiologist and pathologist
- William van Praagh (1845–1907), British educator

== See also ==
- Van Praag
