= Sport Club Barroso =

Barroso
- Full name: Sport Club Barroso
- Nickname(s): Rubro-Negro Alagoano
- Founded: 11 June 1921 (103 years ago)
- Dissolved: 1951
- Ground: Estádio do Mutange, Maceió, Alagoas state, Brazil
- Capacity: 6,000
| Home colors | Away colors |

Sport Club Barroso, commonly known as Barroso, was a Brazilian football club based in Maceió, Alagoas state. They won the Campeonato Alagoano once.

== History ==
The club was founded on 11 June 1921. They won the Campeonato Alagoano in 1946, and finished in the second place in the 1947 edition, finishing behind Alexandria. The club folded in 1951.

== Stadium ==
Esporte Clube Barroso played their home games at Estádio Gustavo Paiva, nicknamed Estádio do Mutange. The stadium has a maximum capacity of 6,000 people.

== Honours ==
- Campeonato Alagoano
  - Winners (1): 1946
  - Runners-up (1): 1947
- Torneio Início de Alagoas
  - Winners (1): 1947
