= Siegfried van Praag =

Dutch writer (1899–2002)

Siegfried Emanuel van Praag
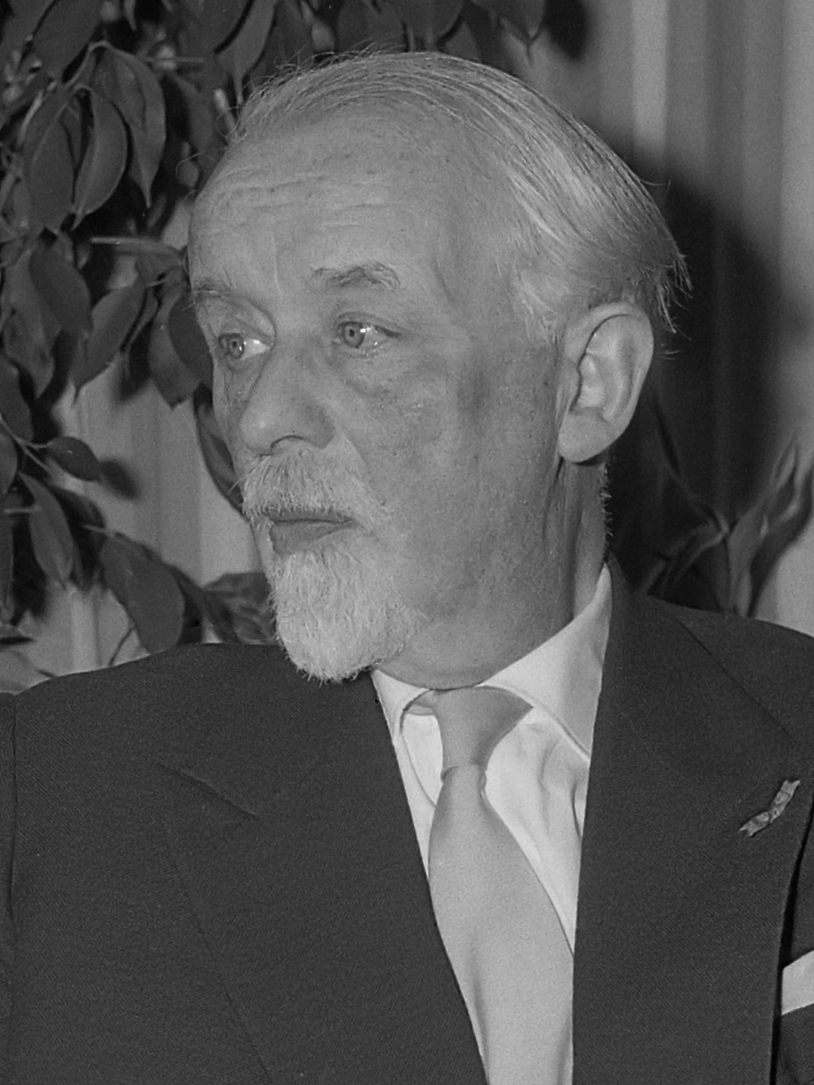
- Siegfried van Praag (1962)
- Born: 8 August 1899; Amsterdam, Netherlands
- Died: 16 March 2002 (aged 102); Brussels, Belgium
- Occupations: Novelist, Essayist, Publicist, Teacher
- Writing career
- Period: 1920s to 1980s
- Genres: Romance, Historical romance, Jewish culture, Jewish identity, Essay, Autobiographical writing
- Notable works: Een Lange Jeugd in Joods Amsterdam, Jeruzalem van het Westen, La Judith, Cabaret der Plaatsvervangers

Siegfried Emanuel van Praag (8 August 1899 in Amsterdam – 16 March 2002 in Brussels), was a prolific Dutch writer of more than 60 books.

== Life ==
He was born to Jewish parents and was the youngest of three sons. His father, Herman van Praag, worked in the diamond trade. His mother's name was Grietje de Jongh. Apart from his Dutch and Jewish cultural roots, Siegfried's education also introduced him to French language and culture. He pursued French studies at the Universiteit van Amsterdam, after which he became a lecturer at the Hogereburgerscholen in Purmerend.

In the same year that Van Praag published his first novel De Weegschaal, he also married Hilda Sanders, a journalist. These new changes in his life came at the expense of his teaching career, which was abandoned for the time being. Still he remained active as an academic by publishing articles that were primarily concerned with Jewish and French literature. Also, his wife's profession may have introduced him to radio broadcasting, an occupation which van Praag held during various phases of his life.

The rise of Nazism may have prompted a move to Brussels in 1936, and was definitely the reason why van Praag and his family left the continent for England in 1940. In London he worked for the Dutch and Belgian radio programmes of the BBC. The war made a considerable impression on van Praag and his consequent preoccupation with Jewish culture and identity—specifically Dutch Jewish culture and the newly formed country of Israel—can be noted in the published works that follow this period. But unlike so many other artists who were exiled to England or The New World he did return to Europe after the war, settling in the Netherlands once more. Still writing, he now also resumed his teaching career and taught in at a Lyceum in Overveen, then later at the Nutsacademie in Rotterdam.

Though his greatest relevance is as a novelist, van Praag was also an essayist and an autobiographical writer. His autobiography De Arend en de Mol (The Eagle and the Mole) was published in 1973, but because of his fierce interest in Jewish identity some of his fictional and non-fictional writings may also have an autobiographical ring to them: thus Een Lange Jeugd in Joods Amsterdam (A Long Youth in Jewish Amsterdam) reflects van Praag's own experience growing up in 'Jewish' Amsterdam. By the 1980s he was nearing the end of his writing career, though he lived for another 20 years.

== Works ==
- Een Lange Jeugd in Joods Amsterdam (A Long Youth in Jewish Amsterdam)
- De Toverheg (The Witchcraft)
- Het Heilig Stramien: Een kleine Familieroman (The Holy Trinity: A Small Family's Novel)
- Damesprotest (Ladies' Protest)
- Sam Levita's Levensdans (Sam Levita's Life Dance)
- La Judith
- Cabaret der Plaatsvervangers (Cabaret of Alternates)
- Jeruzalem van het Westen (Jerusalem of the West)
- Het Huisaltaar (The House Altar)
- Onder de Streling van het Groen (Under the Stroking of the Green)
