= Rubinstein =

Rubinstein is a surname of Ashkenazi Jews. It comes from German and Yiddish, where it means "ruby-stone". Notable persons named Rubinstein include:

== A–E ==
- Akiba Rubinstein (1880–1961), Polish chess grandmaster
- Amnon Rubinstein (1931–2024), Israeli scholar, politician and columnist
- Anton Rubinstein (1829–1894), Russian pianist, composer and conductor, brother of Nikolai Rubinstein
- Ariel Rubinstein (born 1951), game theorist at Tel Aviv University and New York University
- Arthur Rubinstein (1887–1982), Polish-American pianist
- Arthur B. Rubinstein (1938–2018), American drama and film score composer and conductor
- Benjamin B. Rubinstein (1905–1989), Finnish-born American psychoanalyst
- Benny Rubinstein, Israeli footballer
- Dave Rubinstein (1964–1993), singer in the band Reagan Youth
- David Rubinstein (pianist) (born 1949)
- David Rubinstein (social historian) (1932–2019), American-born social historian living in England, specializing in the 19th and 20th centuries
- Elyakim Rubinstein (born 1947), Israeli diplomat, former Attorney General of Israel and vice president of the Supreme Court of Israel
- Erna Rubinstein (1903–1966), Hungarian-American classical violinist

== F–J ==
- Gennadii Rubinstein
- Gillian Rubinstein (born 1942), English-born Australian author of children's books and for adults as Lian Hearn
- Hadar Rubinstein (born 1967), Israeli Olympic swimmer
- Helena Rubinstein (1872–1965), Polish-born American cosmetics entrepreneur and art collector
- Hilary Rubinstein (1926–2012), British literary agent and publisher
- Ida Rubinstein (1885–1960), Russian dancer with the Ballet Russe in Paris
- Jacob Leon Rubenstein (1911–1967), birth name of Jack Ruby, American nightclub owner who killed Lee Harvey Oswald
- John Rubinstein (born 1946), American actor, singer, composer, director; son of pianist Arthur Rubinstein
- Jolyon Rubinstein (born 1981), English satirist, director and writer
- Jon Rubinstein (born 1956), American computer scientist and electrical engineer instrumental in the creation of the iPod
- J. Hyam Rubinstein (born 1948), Australian mathematician primarily interested in topology

== K–O ==
- Lev Rubinstein (1947–2024), Russian poet and essayist
- Marcos Rubinstein, Swiss engineer
- Mark Rubinstein, American financial economist and financial engineer
- Michael Rubinstein (born 1973), birth name of Michael Weston, American television and film actor and son of John Rubinstein and Judi West
- Nicolai Rubinstein (1911–2002), Russian historian
- Nikolai Rubinstein (1835–1881), Russian pianist and composer, brother of Anton Rubinstein

== P–Z ==
- Pablo Rubinstein, Chilean doctor who pioneered the preservation and medical use of placenta blood as a form of stem cell technology
- Robert A. Rubinstein (born 1951), American anthropologist
- Robert J. Rubinstein (born 1952), entrepreneur and founder of the TBLI group
- Roman Rubinshteyn (born 1996), Belarusian-Israeli basketball player
- Sergei Rubinstein, Soviet psychologist, critic to Lev Vygotsky
- Seymour I. Rubinstein (born 1934), American software developer
- Susanna Rubinstein (1847–1914), Austrian psychologist
- William Rubinstein (born 1946), British historian
- Yaakov Rubinstein, Israeli violinist
- Yitzhak Rubinstein (1888–1945), Rabbi, Zionist activist, leader of the Lithuanian Jewish community, member of the Polish Senate and Sejm
- Zdenka Rubinstein (1911–1961), Croatian operatic soprano
- Zelda Rubinstein (1933–2010), American actress

== See also ==
- Rubenstein, surname
