= Canelas e Espiunca =

Civil parish in Portugal

- Civil parish
- Location in Portugal
- Coordinates: 40.973°N 8.201°W
- Country: Portugal
- Region: Norte
- Metropolitan area: Porto
- District: Aveiro
- Municipality: Arouca

Area
  - Total: 35.73 km^{2} (13.80 sq mi)

Population (2011)
  - Total: 1,183
  - Density: 33.11/km^{2} (85.75/sq mi)
- Time zone: UTC+00:00 (WET)
  - Summer (DST): UTC+01:00 (WEST)

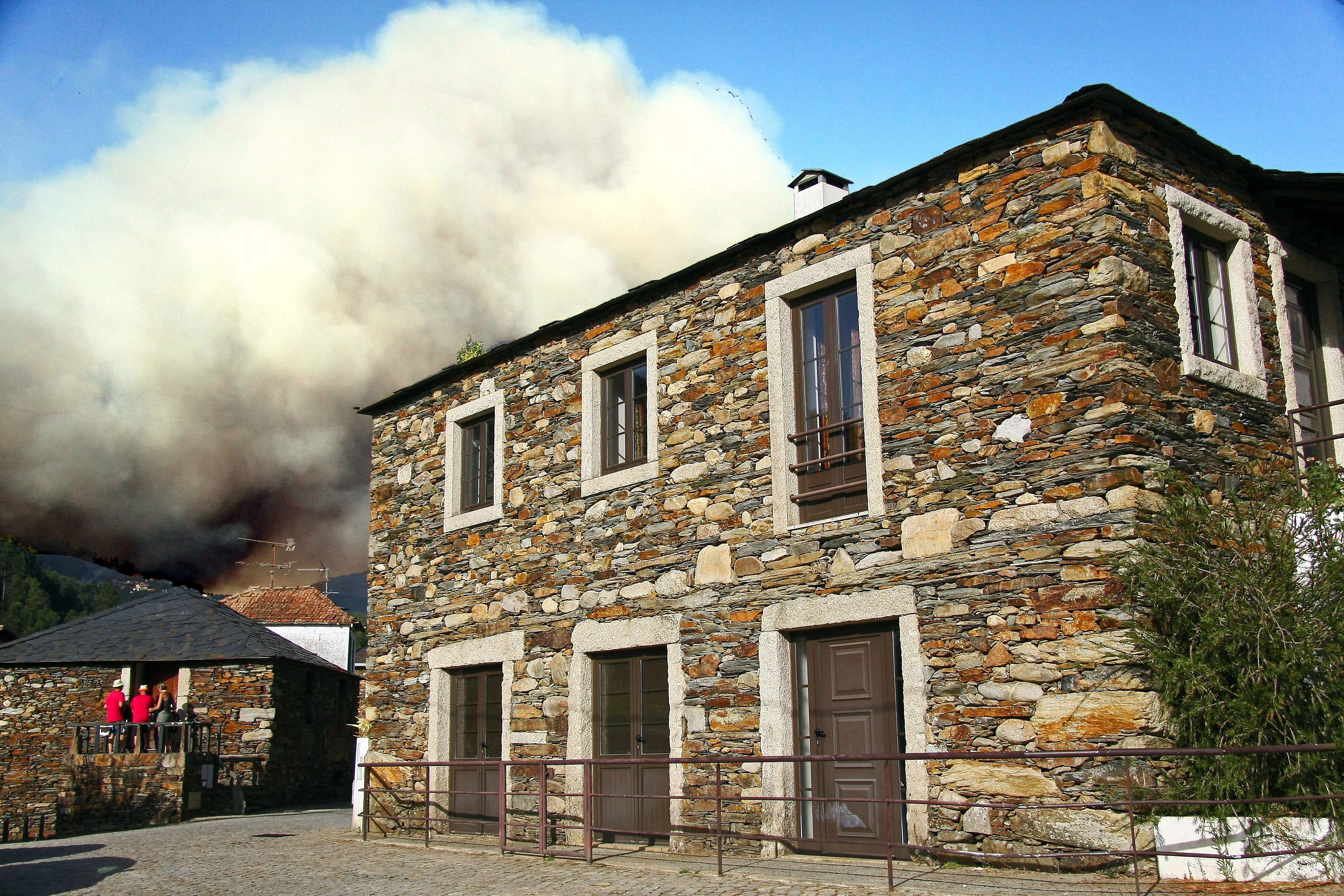
Espiunca - Portugal

Canelas e Espiunca is a civil parish in the municipality of Arouca, Portugal. The population in 2011 was 1,183, in an area of 35.73 km^{2} (13.80 sq mi). It was formed in 2013 by the merger of the former parishes Canelas and Espiunca.
