= Paradiso (surname) =

Paradiso is an Italian surname. Notable people with the surname include:

- Amerigo Paradiso (born 1962), Italian footballer
- Angelo Paradiso (born 1977), Italian footballer
- Joseph A. Paradiso, American academic
- Michael Paradiso, American neuroscientist
- Vincent Paradiso, American ballet dancer
