= Schwarzschild =

Schwarzschild (German pronunciation [ˈʃvaʁtsʃɪlt]) is a German surname meaning "black sign" or "black shield". Notable people with the surname include:

- Henry Schwarzschild (1925–1996), American lawyer
- Karl Schwarzschild (1873–1916), German physicist and astronomer
- Leopold Schwarzschild (1891–1950), German author
- Luise Hercus (née Schwarzschild; 1926–2018), Australian linguist
- Margot Wicki-Schwarzschild (1931–2020), German Holocaust survivor
- Martin Schwarzschild (1912–1997), German-American astronomer
- Shimon Schwarzschild (1925–2021), German-born American environmental activist
- Steven Schwarzschild (1924–1989), American rabbi, philosopher, theologian and editor

== See also ==
- Rothschild
