= Romanel =

Romanel may refer to:

- Romanel-sur-Lausanne, Vaud, Switzerland
- Romanel-sur-Morges, Vaud, Switzerland
