= Estádio Mutange =

Multi-use Stadium

Coordinates: 9.64°S 35.75°W

- Mutange
- Interactive map of Estádio Mutange
- Full name: Estádio Gustavo Paiva
- Location: Maceió, Alagoas, Brazil
- Owner: Centro Sportivo Alagoano
- Capacity: 4,000
- Surface: Grass

Construction
- Built: 1922
- Opened: November 22, 1922
- Renovated: 1934, 1950, 1996

Tenants
- Centro Sportivo Alagoano; Associação Atlética Ponte Preta (AL); Esporte Clube Barroso (1922-1951)

Estádio Mutange, also known as Estádio Gustavo Paiva, is a multi-use stadium located in Maceió, Brazil. It is used mostly for football matches and hosts the home matches of Centro Sportivo Alagoano and Associação Atlética Ponte Preta (AL), and hosted the home matches of Esporte Clube Barroso. The stadium has a maximum capacity of 4,000 people and was built in 1922.
