= Rafał Berliński =

Polish footballer

Personal information
- Date of birth: 5 June 1976 (age 50)
- Place of birth: Płock, Poland
- Height: 1.80 m (5 ft 11 in)
- Position: Midfielder

Senior career*
Years	Team	Apps	(Gls)
1994–1996	CKS Czeladź		
1996	Raków Częstochowa	0	(0)
1997–1998	Varta Namysłów		
1998–2001	Odra Opole		
2001	Stomil Olsztyn	5	(0)
2002	Szczakowianka Jaworzno		
2002–2005	GKS Bełchatów	87	(0)
2006	FK Haugesund	8	(0)
2007	Kolejarz Stróże		
2007–2008	Zagłębie Sosnowiec	39	(0)
2009–2011	Sandecja Nowy Sącz	73	(1)
2012	Górnik Piaski		
2013	Pilica Koniecpol		
2013	Szczakowianka Jaworzno	13	(0)
2014–2017	GFC Düren 1899	65	(8)
2018	SpVgg Schwarz-Weiß Düren	6	(0)
2019	SV 1923 Merken		
- * Club domestic league appearances and goals

Rafał Berliński (born 5 June 1976) is a Polish former professional footballer who played as a midfielder.
