= Kornberg (surname) =

Kornberg is an habitational German, Swedish, and Jewish (Ashkenazic) surname. Its principal meaning is "grain hill", from German Korn "grain" + Berg "mountain", "hill".

Notable people with the surname include:

- Arthur Kornberg (1918–2007), American biochemist, winner of the 1959 Nobel Prize in Medicine, father of Roger D. Kornberg and Thomas B. Kornberg
- Hans Leo Kornberg (1928–2019), British biochemist,
- Roger D. Kornberg (born 1947), American biochemist, winner of the 2006 Nobel Prize in Chemistry
- Thomas B. Kornberg (born 1948), American biochemist, University of California, San Francisco
