= Estádio José Duarte de Paiva =

Multi-use stadium located in Sete Lagoas, Brazil

Estadio José Duarte de Paiva, was a multi-use stadium located in Sete Lagoas, Brazil. It was used mostly for football matches and had hosted the home matches of Democrata Futebol Clube. The stadium had a maximum capacity of 4,000 people.

== Background ==
In 2006, the stadium was sold for three hundred thousand reais to the Bretas supermarket chain, and was later demolished to make way for a hypermarket.
