= Brittni Paiva =

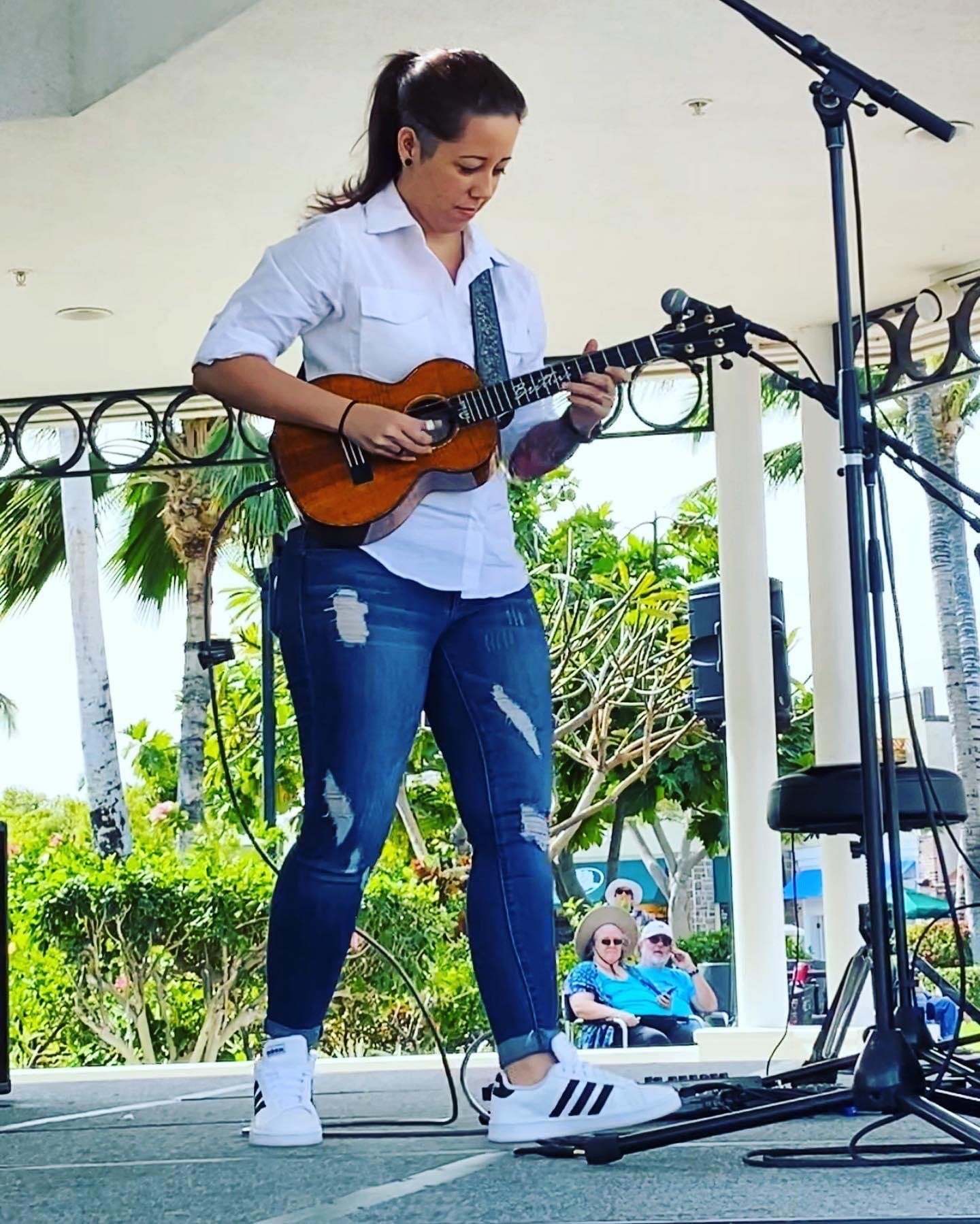
- Paiva in 2020

Background information
- Birth name: Brittni Kahealani Paiva
- Born: 28 September 1988 (age 36); Hilo, Hawaii, U.S.
- Genres: Hawaiian; Pop; Jazz; Latin; Flamenco; Classical; Rock; World
- Occupations: Musician, songwriter, music producer
- Instruments: Ukulele, piano, bass, guitar, drums
- Years active: 2005–present
- Website: brittnipaiva.com

Brittni Paiva is an American musician, songwriter, and music producer. She is best known for playing the ukulele and has won several Na Hoku Hanohano Awards, including Most Promising Artist of the Year for her album, Brittni x 3, which she won at sixteen years old in 2005. She has performed with Carlos Santana and her 2012 album release, Tell U What, features artists Michael McDonald, and Chuck Findley, among others.

== Early life ==
Brittni Kahealani Paiva was born on September 28, 1988, and raised in Hilo, Hawaii, and is of Portuguese, Danish, Japanese and Hawaiian descent. She was homeschooled through high school before attending Berklee College of Music. She is a classically-trained pianist and began taking lessons when she was four years old. Paiva was given her first ukulele at eleven years old by her grandfather. She learned to play the guitar, bass, and drums during her teen years. She began performing live in 2003 and won 1st place at the 2004 Hamakua Music Festival, winning a $1500 scholarship.

== Music career ==
Paiva is a songwriter, music producer, multi-instrumentalist whose music is influenced by Hawaiian, jazz, rock, flamenco, and classical music, as well as world music. When she was 15 years old, she released her debut album, Brittni x 3, which she wrote, produced, and played all of the instruments on. The album won the Na Hoku Hanohano Award from the Hawaiʻi Academy of Recording Arts for Most Promising Artist of the Year in 2005. She has released five studio albums.

The documentary, Brittni Paiva: Living Ukulele, released in 2011, received favorable reviews and was an official winner at the Hana, Molokai, Lanai Film Festival. Shortly after, she collaborated with jazz saxophonist Tom Scott on her fifth album, Tell U What, which featured guest artists Michael McDonald, Chuck Findley, Ray Parker, Jr., and Arturo Sandoval. The album won the 2013 Na Hoku Hanohano Award for Ukulele Album of the Year and Instrumental Composition of the Year for its title track, Tell U What. The following year, Paiva was personally invited by Carlos Santana to perform with him at his concert at the Blaisdell Area in Honolulu, Hawaii. She has performed nationally such as the Los Angeles International Ukulele Festival and California Worldfest as well as touring internationally, including Germany, Japan, and Australia. Paiva teaches private music lessons at Brittni Paiva School of Music.

Paiva was formerly in the music duo BLVCKBOW, with Jasmine Crowe.

== Awards ==
- 2005 - Most Promising Artist of the Year - Na Hoku Hanohano Award
- 2006 - Best Ukulele Album - Hawaii Music Awards
- 2007 - Best Ukulele Album - Hawaii Music Awards
- 2011 - Entertainer of the Year - MauiFest Hawaii
- 2013 - Ukulele Album of the Year - Na Hoku Hanohano Award
- 2013 - Instrumental Composition of the Year - Na Hoku Hanohano Award

== Discography ==
- 2004 - Brittni x 3
- 2005 - Hear...
- 2006 - Brittni
- 2009 - Four Strings: The Fire Within
- 2012 - Tell U What
