= Alan Rubenstein =

British businessman

- Born: 1956 or 1957 (age 68–69); United Kingdom
- Occupations: investment banking and asset management
- Title: Chief executive, Pension Protection Fund
- Predecessor: Partha Dasgupta
- Board member of: Robeco
- Spouse: married
- Children: 2

Alan Rubenstein (born 1956/57) is the chief executive of the Pension Protection Fund (PPF) since April 2009, having previously worked in investment banking and asset management.

Rubenstein has previously worked for Scottish Widows, Morgan Stanley and Lehman Brothers, where he was a managing director. In April 2009, he succeeded Partha Dasgupta as chief executive of the PPF.

In 2014, Rubenstein joined the supervisory board of Robeco, the Dutch asset manager.

Rubenstein is married with two daughters, and lives in Surrey.
