= Mitrani =

Mitrani is a surname which is used by Jewish people. It is a combination of the Hebrew preposition mi and Trani meaning "from Trani".

It was first adopted by the Italian-origin Sephardic Jews who settled in Wallachia, Romania, coming from Trani, Italy, in the 1700s. In a 1961 study the same view is also emphasized adding that it is a well-established way for Jewish people to formulate names based on the places where their ancestors resided. It has a variant, Mitrany. Notable people with the surname are as follows:

- David Mitrany (1888–1975), Romanian-born British scholar and historian
- David Mitrani Arenal (born 1966), Cuban writer
- Luke Mitrani (born 1990), American snowboarder and musician
- Michel Mitrani (1930–1996), French film director and screenwriter
- Noël Mitrani (born 1969), Canadian-born French film director
- Nora Mitrani (1921–1961), Bulgarian writer
- Rachel Mitrani, birth name of Shelley Morrison (1936–2019), American actress
