= Berlinsky =

Berlinsky is a surname. Notable people with the surname include:

- Dmitri Berlinsky, Russian violinist and teacher
- Valentin Berlinsky (1925–2008), Russian cellist

== See also ==
- Berlinski
