= Peretz Gerondi =

13th-century Iberian kabbalist and rabbi

Peretz ben Isaac Cohen Gerondi
- פרץ בן יצחק כהן גירונדי

Personal life
- Born: fl. late 13th century Iberian Peninsula
- Era: 13th century
- Notable work: Ma'areket ha-Elahut
- Known for: Author of Ma'areket ha-Elahut
- Occupation: Rabbi, Kabbalist

Religious life
- Religion: Judaism

Peretz ben Isaac Cohen Gerondi (Hebrew: פרץ בן יצחק כהן גירונדי; fl. late 13th century) was a 13th-century Iberian kabbalist and rabbi. The surname "Gerondi" is due to a deduction by Adolf Jellinek, and is used for the purpose of describing more in detail the author of Ma'areket ha-Elahut. A certain Peretz, who lived toward the end of the thirteenth century, is mentioned as the author of this kabbalistic work. Some works of Peretz of Corbeil have been erroneously attributed to Gerondi.
