= Alvarenga (Arouca) =

Civil parish in Portugal

- Civil parish
- Location in Portugal
- Coordinates: 40.968°N 8.162°W
- Country: Portugal
- Region: Norte
- Metropolitan area: Porto
- District: Aveiro
- Municipality: Arouca

Area
  - Total: 38.77 km^{2} (14.97 sq mi)

Population (2011)
  - Total: 1,223
  - Density: 31.55/km^{2} (81.70/sq mi)
- Time zone: UTC+00:00 (WET)
  - Summer (DST): UTC+01:00 (WEST)

Alvarenga is a Portuguese community in the municipality of Arouca. The population in 2011 was 1,223, in an area of 38.77 km^{2} (14.97 sq mi). It was a town (vila) between 1514 and 1836. Was formed by the predecessor community of Alvarenga and Canelas. Had, in 1801, 1998 inhabitants. It home to sports club G.D. Santa Cruz de Alvarenga.
