= Romayne =

Romayne is a given name and surname. Notable people with the name include:

== People with the given name ==
- Romayne Wheeler, American concert pianist, composer, writer and researcher

== People with the surname ==
- Douglas Romayne, American composer and musician
- Nicholas Romayne, American physician

== See also ==
- Ronayne Marsh-Brown, English footballer
- Romaine (name)
