= Romanin =

Romanin is a surname. Notable people with this surname include:

- Fides Romanin (1934–2019), Italian cross country skier
- Samuele Romanin (1808–1961), Italian historian
- Dmitri Romanin, Soviet politician and Communist Party functionary
- Leone Romanin Jacur (1847-1928), Italian politician

== See also ==
- Romanin was a pseudonym of Jean Moulin
- Gaudre de Romanin, a river in France
