= Veneziani =

Veneziani is an Italian surname. Notable people with the surname include:

- Carlo Veneziani (1882–1950), Italian playwright and screenwriter
- Jole Veneziani (1901–1989), Italian fashion designer
