= Ana Paiva =

Computer scientist

- Education: University of Lisbon, Instituto Superior Técnico
- Scientific career
- Thesis: Dynamic user and learner modeling (1995)

Ana Maria Severino de Almeida e Paiva is Secretary of State for Science in Portugal since April 5, 2024. The Portuguese-born secretary is a computer scientist that researches and explores the creation of intelligent interactive robots. Using her knowledge in robotics and artificial intelligence, she designs AI robots to learn and interact with humans the same way other humans do. Along with her organization in GAIPS and students at University of Lisbon, she has written multiple scientific articles about her findings and research, winning notable awards such as Blue Sky Awards at the AAAI (Association for the Advancement of Artificial Intelligence) in 2022.

== Education and career ==
In 1987, Paiva graduated in electrical and computer engineering from the Instituto Superior Tecnico (IST) of the University of Lisbon. Four years later, she obtained her master's degree in electrical and computer engineering at the same university. After graduating, Paiva moved to the United Kingdom to study at Lancaster University, earning her PhD in artificial intelligence in 1996. Paiva’s research paper titled, “Dynamic User and Learning Modeling” would be her Ph.D. thesis she published and allowed her to recevive her doctorate.

Since 1997, she has been working at IST as a professor and coordinates the master’s and PhD programs in computer science and computer engineering. Paiva would take a total of 25 Ph.D. students under her program and help her students with research and formatting their thesis that they would later research in. In 2011, she took her aggregation exam at IST, an exam that publicly evaluates a person’s academic, professional, and research excellence. In 2020, Paiva would earn a fellowship at Radcliffe Institute for Advanced Study, located at Harvard University. In 2024, Paiva would be appointed as Secretary of State for Science on April 5, 2024 and is still in office to this date.

== Organizations ==
In 2000, Paiva founded the Group of AI for people and society (GAIPS). The organization is affiliated with the Instituto de Engenharia de Sistemas e Computadores - Investigação e Desenvolvimento (INESC-ID) and IST. This research group dedicates its research on Artificial Intelligence, specifically in machine learning and human-robot interaction. Their main goal is to develop empathetic agents and understand their behavior. Additionally, they research ways to improve user-machine interaction. Their purpose behind their research is to innovate AI and human interactions. Since the creation of GAIPS, the organization has had over 70 PhD students in their program and helped further their knowledge and education in artificial intelligence. GAIPS have created over 25 projects ranging from games to robot and human interactions.

== Selected publications ==
Over the twenty years, Paiva has helped and published over 120 journals and articles in AI interactions. Paiva has been awarded six awards from distinct organizations such as the International Conference on Social Robotics, Institute of Electrical and Electronics Engineers (IEEE), and International Conference on Advances of Computer Entertainment. Journals articles include:

- Dias, João; Paiva, Ana (2005), Bento, Carlos; Cardoso, Amílcar; Dias, Gaël (eds.), "Feeling and Reasoning: A Computational Model for Emotional Characters", Progress in Artificial Intelligence, vol. 3808, Berlin, Heidelberg: Springer Berlin Heidelberg, pp. 127–140, doi:10.1007/11595014_13, ISBN 978-3-540-30737-2, retrieved 2022-01-02
- Poklukar, Petra; Vasco, Miguel; Yin, Hang; Melo, Francisco S.; Paiva, Ana; Kragic, Danica (2022-06-28). "Geometric Multimodal Contrastive Representation Learning". Proceedings of the 39th International Conference on Machine Learning. PMLR: 17782–17800.
- Alves-Oliveira, Patrícia; Arriaga, Patrícia; Xavier, Carla; Hoffman, Guy; Paiva, Ana (2022). "Creativity Landscapes: Systematic Review Spanning 70 Years of Creativity Interventions for Children". The Journal of Creative Behavior. 56 (1): 16–40. doi:10.1002/jocb.514. ISSN 2162-6057
- Alves-Oliveira, Patrícia; Arriaga, Patrícia; Paiva, Ana; Hoffman, Guy (2021-03-08). "Children as Robot Designers". Proceedings of the 2021 ACM/IEEE International Conference on Human-Robot Interaction. HRI '21. New York, NY, USA: Association for Computing Machinery: 399–408. doi:10.1145/3434073.3444650. ISBN 978-1-4503-8289-2
- Elgarf, Maha; Calvo-Barajas, Natalia; Alves-Oliveira, Patricia; Perugia, Giulia; Castellano, Ginevra; Peters, Chirstopher; Paiva, Ana (2022-03). ""And then what happens?" Promoting Children's Verbal Creativity Using a Robot". 2022 17th ACM/IEEE International Conference on Human-Robot Interaction (HRI): 71–79. doi:10.1109/HRI53351.2022.9889408

== Awards and honors ==
In 2018, Paiva received first place in the Blue Sky Ideas Conference Track at the AAAI Conference on Artificial Intelligence. Paiva was named a fellow for the European Association for Artificial Intelligence in 2019 and of the Association for the Advancement of Artificial Intelligence. In 2023, Ana Paiva also received the research.com computer science leader award in Portugal, three years in a row from 2022 to 2024. She won the best Paper Award- Conferencia International Conference on Social Robotics in 2019, together with the Best Interdisciplinary Paper Award, IEEE- ROMAN, International Conference on Robot & Human Interactive Communication during that same year. She won the best Student Paper Award (student Elmira Ydollahi) at IDC- Interaction Design for Children in 2018. She won the best Paper Award- Conference Human-Robot Interaction in 2016. She won the best paper award- ICSR12 (International Conference on Social Robotics), and she also won the best paper award- ACE12 (International Conference on Advances of Computer Entertainment) winning both in the same year 2012. Ana Paiva won the Prémio Inovação Jovem Engenheiro in Portugal in 1991. She also won the fellow of the European AI in 2019.
