= Paiva River =

River in northern Portugal

Coordinates: 40°3′N 8°15′W

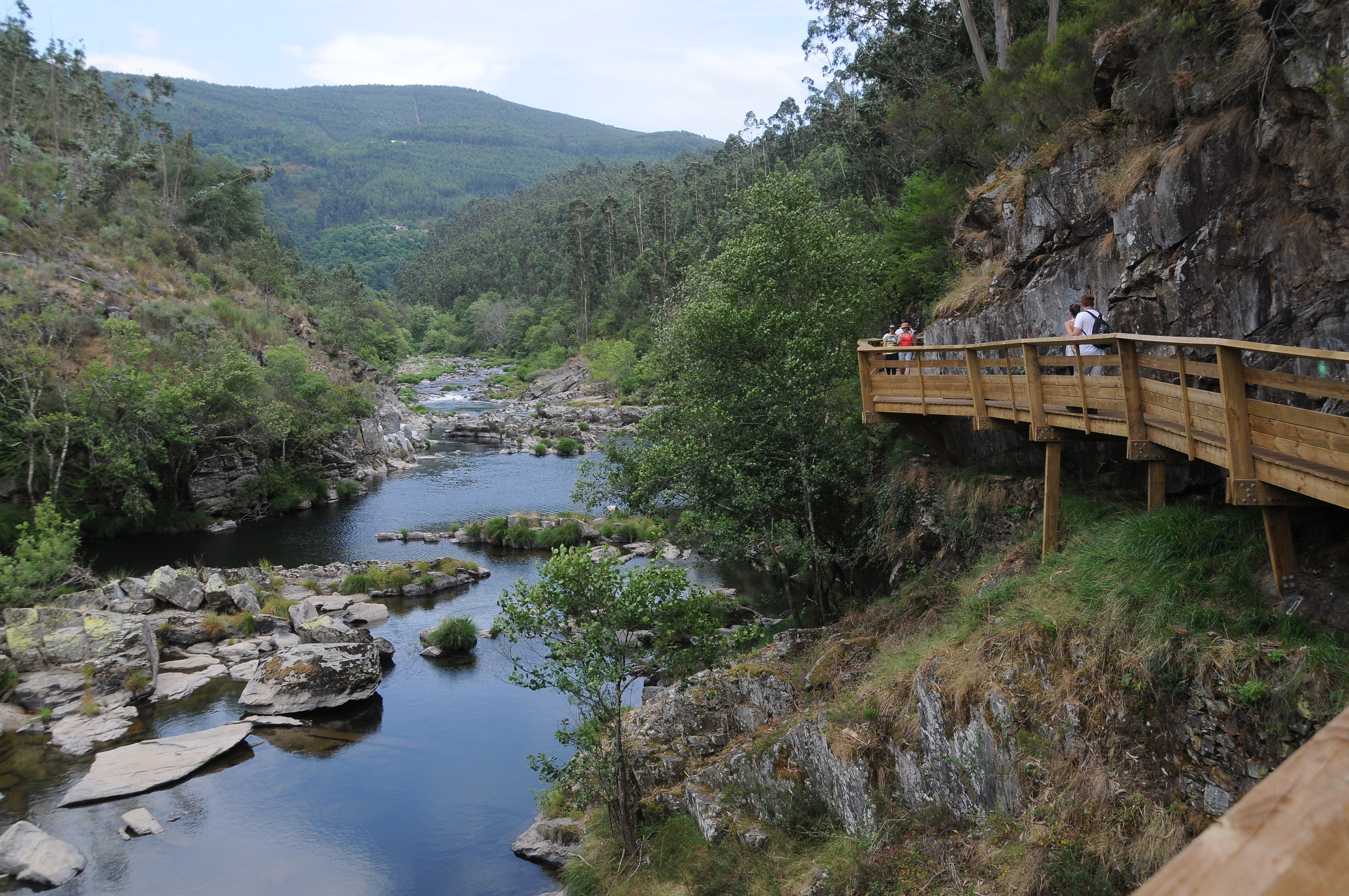
- Native name: Rio Paiva (Portuguese)

Location
- Country: Portugal

Physical characteristics
- Source
  - location: Serra de Leomil
- Mouth
  - location: Douro
- Basin size: 111.5 km^{2} (43.1 sq mi)

Basin features
- Progression: Douro→ Atlantic Ocean

The Paiva River (Portuguese pronunciation: [ˈpajˈvɐ]) is a river that rises in the Sierra de Leomil, more specifically in the parish of Pêra Velha, Aldeia de Nacomba e Ariz - belonging to the municipality of Moimenta da Beira - and flows into the Douro, in Castelo de Paiva, flowing through the parish of Fornos on the left bank. On the right bank, it flows through the parish of Souselo, Cinfães.

It is classified as a Site of Community Importance in the Natura 2000 Network.

== Threats to the Paiva River ==
The main threat beyond man, comes from the invasion by acacias and the frequent installation of monocultural stands of eucalyptus and maritime pine.

Other threats are the implementation of small and large hydroelectric projects; punctual cases of extraction and washing of aggregates, fires, construction of dams, clandestine constructions, implantation of aviaries and fish farms, afforestation of agricultural lands, especially lameiros, cervunais and malhadais.

The urban-tourist expansion is another concern for the defense associations of the Paiva valley, with the significant increase in visitors in recent years, due to the inauguration of the "Passadiços do Paiva" in Arouca.

== Arouca Geopark ==
One of the main crossing points of this watercourse is the municipality of Arouca, where the Passadiços do Paiva were built, an hour away from Porto, which allow, for a moment, to leave the reality of the urban space of the city and enter a scenario out of a film, being a wooden walkway of about 8.7 kilometers, with the construction of an additional 12 kilometers, located in the parish of Canelas e Espiunca, in the municipality of Arouca built along the left bank of the Paiva River, in the hydrographic basin of the Douro River, between the bridge of Espiunca and the river beach of Areinho, thus encompassing the area known as the "Garganta do Paiva", being one of the main elements of the Arouca Geopark.

The Passadiços do Paiva, on 4 September 2016, were elected as the most innovative tourism project in Europe, in the 2016 edition of the World Travel Awards, in the category of Leading Tourism Development Project in Europe, considered the Oscars of Tourism worldwide.
