= Mortara (surname) =

Mortara is an Italian surname. Notable people with the surname include:

- Edgardo Mortara (1851–1940), Italian priest, and central figure in the Mortara case in which papal authorities seized him from his Jewish family when he was six years old
- Edoardo Mortara (born 1987), professional Italian racecar driver
- Giorgio Mortara (1885–1967), Italian economist
- Marco Mortara (1815–1894), Italian rabbi
