= Tom Snyders =

American comedian (1961–2021)

Tom Snyders (January 31, 1961 – May 2, 2021) was an American comedian who rode his bicycle around the country, commenting on road signs that he encountered. He started in Las Vegas in 1983, and had traveled over 200,000 miles at the time of his death. He made appearances on Good Morning America and Live with Regis and Kathie Lee, as well as on Comedy Central and ESPN.
