= Rizzoli =

Rizzoli (pronounced [ritˈtsɔːli]) is an Italian surname.

== People ==
- Achilles Rizzoli (1896–1981), American artist
- Andrea Rizzoli (1914–1983), Italian entrepreneur, publisher and film producer, son of Angelo
- Angelo Rizzoli (1889–1970), Italian publisher
  - RCS MediaGroup, formerly "A. Rizzoli & C." and "Rizzoli Editore", a publishing company founded by Angelo Rizzoli and previously called Rizzoli-Corriere della Sera. Owner of the brand Rizzoli in non-book publishing
  - Rizzoli Libri and Rizzoli Education, publishing divisions acquired by Arnoldo Mondadori Editore from RCS MediaGroup. The division owned the branding rights of Rizzoli in books
  - Rizzoli Bookstore, Mondadori's bookstore in New York City, previously owned by Rizzoli Libri's subsidiary
  - Rizzoli, Rizzoli Electa, Biblioteca Universale Rizzoli (BUR), Rizzoli Lizard, Rizzoli Etas, imprints of Arnoldo Mondadori Editore via Rizzoli Libri and other divisions
- Angelo Rizzoli (1943–2013), Italian film producer
- Anna Maria Rizzoli (born 1953), Italian actress
- Francesco Rizzoli (1809–1880), Italian physician and politician
- Giovanni Pietro Rizzoli (fl. 1495–1549), known as Giampietrino, Italian Renaissance painter
- Luca Rizzoli (born 2002), Italian rugby union player
- Nicola Rizzoli (born 1971), Italian football referee
- Paola Malanotte Rizzoli, Italian physical oceanographer
- Pasquale Rizzoli (1871–1953), Italian sculptor

== Fictional characters ==
- Jane Rizzoli, the main character in a crime novel series by Tess Gerritsen
  - Rizzoli & Isles, a 2010 American crime drama television series airing on TNT, based on Gerritsen's novels
