= Critics' Circle Theatre Award =

British theatrical award

Critics' Circle Theatre Awards
- Awarded for: Excellence in theatre-making
- Venue: National Theatre
- Country: United Kingdom
- Presented by: The Critics' Circle
- Hosted by: Mark Lawson (2025)
- First award: 1982
- Website: criticscircle.org.uk/awards/
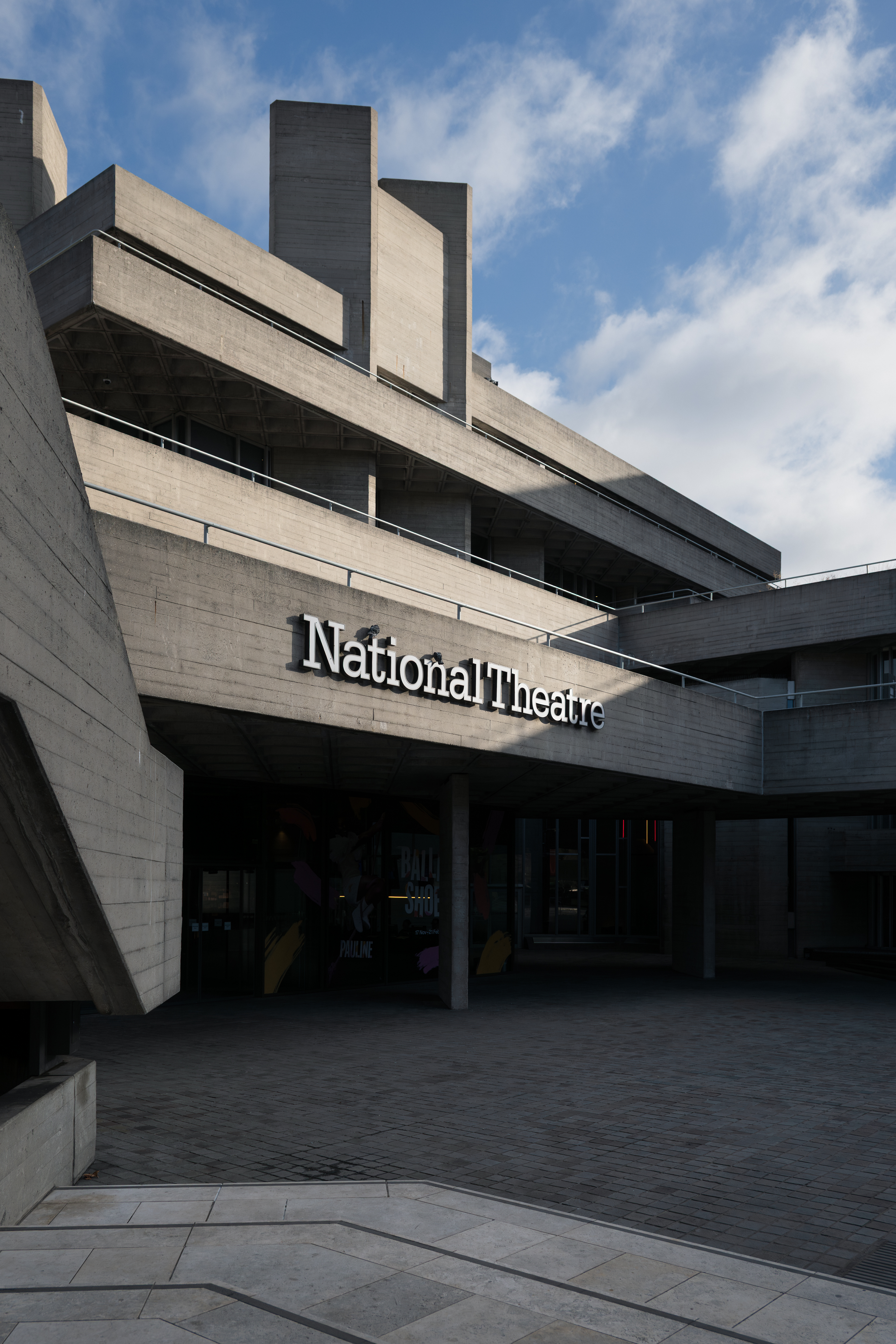
- The 2025 ceremony was held at the National Theatre
- Related: International Association of Theatre Critics

The Critics' Circle Theatre Award, known as the Drama Theatre Award until 1990, are British theatrical awards presented annually for the closing year's theatrical achievements. The winners, from theatre throughout the United Kingdom, are selected via vote by the professional theatre critics of The Critics' Circle.

== History ==
The Critics' Circle Theatre Awards were established by the drama section of The Critics' Circle. The Circle were initially against the idea of giving out awards due to the belief that criticisms are a matter of personal opinions, and that minority views would not be represented in a collective pronouncement in the form of an award. A referendum in 1956, voted by roughly 20% of the Circle's members, rejected the idea of the body giving out awards. This was, however, reversed in another referendum in 1980.

The first Critics' Circle Theatre Awards ceremony was held in 1989. A special anniversary ceremony was held for its 25th anniversary in 2014.

== Current categories ==
As of 2025, the Critics' Circle Theatre awards include the following categories:

- Best Actor
- Best Actress
- Best Director
- Most Promising Playwright
- Best Designer
- The Jack Tinker Award for Most Promising Newcomer: Named after critic Jack Tinker, known for his work at the Daily Mail.
- The Michael Billington Award for Best New Play: Named after Michael Billington, known for his 50-year tenure as chief critic at The Guardian.
- The Trewin Award for Best Shakespearean Performance: Formerly the John and Wendy Trewin Award, after the husband and wife who were seen as leading critics in the UK; later renamed The Trewin Award to honour their son, Ion Trewin, after his passing.
- The Peter Hepple Award for Best Musical: Named after Peter Hepple, former editor of The Stage and former Honorary General Secretary of the Critics’ Circle.
- The Empty Space... Peter Brook Award for Innovative Venue: Named after director Peter Brook and his book, The Empty Space, often dubbed "the seminal text of modern theatre".

== Recipients ==
=== Best Actor ===
1980s

Year	Recipient	Work	Ref
1982	Bob Hoskins	Guys and Dolls	
1983	Derek Jacobi	Cyrano de Bergerac and Much Ado About Nothing	
1984	Brian Cox	Rat in the Skull and Strange Interlude	
1984	Antony Sher	Richard III	
1985	Anthony Hopkins	Pravda	
1985	Gary Oldman	The Pope's Wedding	
1986	Bill Fraser	When We Are Married	
1986	Hugh Quarshi	The Great White Hope	
1987	Brian Cox	Fashion, Taming of the Shrew and Titus Andronicus	
1988	Alex Jennings	Too Clever by Half	
1988	Tom Wilkinson	An Enemy of the People	
1989	Ian McKellen	Othello	

1990s

Year	Recipient	Work	Ref
1990	Michael Gambon	Man of the Moment	
1991	Nigel Hawthorne	The Madness of George III	
1992	Paul Eddington	No Man's Land	
1993	Ian Holm	Moonlight	
1994	Tom Courtenay	Moscow Stations	
1995	Daniel Massey	Taking Sides	
1996	David Suchet	Who's Afraid of Virginia Woolf?	
1997	Ian Holm	King Lear	
1998	Kevin Spacey	The Iceman Cometh	
1999	Henry Goodman	The Merchant of Venice	

2000s

Year	Recipient	Work
2000	Michael Gambon	The Caretaker
2001	Ian McDiarmid	Faith Healer
2002	Simon Russell Beale	Uncle Vanya
2003	Michael Sheen	Caligula
2004	Richard Griffiths	The History Boys
2005	Simon Russell Beale	The Philanthropist
2006	Rufus Sewell	Rock 'n' Roll
2007	Charles Dance	Shadowlands
2008	Kenneth Branagh	Ivanov
2009	Mark Rylance	Jerusalem

2010s

Year	Recipient	Work	Ref
2010	David Suchet	All My Sons	
2011	Benedict Cumberbatch	Frankenstein	
2012	Adrian Lester	Red Velvet	
2013	Lenny Henry	Fences	
2014	Mark Strong	A View from the Bridge	
2015	Kenneth Cranham	The Father	
2016	Stephen Dillane	Faith Healer	
2017	Bryan Cranston	Network	
2018	Kyle Soller	The Inheritance	
2019	Andrew Scott	Present Laughter	

2020s

Year	Recipient	Work	Ref
2022	Ben Daniels	The Normal Heart	
2023	Giles Terera	Blues for an Alabama Sky and Othello	
2024	Andrew Scott	Vanya	
2025	Mark Strong	Oedipus	
2026	Brendan Gleeson	The Weir	

=== Best Actress ===
1980s

Year	Recipient	Work	Ref
1982	Judi Dench	The Importance of Being Earnest and A Kind of Alaska	
1983	Juliet Stevenson	Measure for Measure	
1984	Glenda Jackson	Strange Interlude	
1985	Vanessa Redgrave	The Seagull	
1986	Joan Plowright	The House of Bernarda Alba	
1987	Judi Dench	Antony and Cleopatra	
1988	Pauline Collins	Shirley Valentine	
1989	Fiona Shaw	Electra and The Good Person of Sichuan	

1990s

Year	Recipient	Work	Ref
1990	Josette Simon	After the Fall	
1991	Fiona Shaw	Hedda Gabler	
1992	Eileen Atkins	The Night of the Iguana	
1993	Penelope Wilton	The Deep Blue Sea	
1994	Clare Higgins	The Children's Hour and Sweet Bird of Youth	
1995	Claire Skinner	The Glass Menagerie	
1996	Janet McTeer	A Doll's House	
1997	Judi Dench	Amy's View	
1998	Sinéad Cusack	Our Lady of Sligo	
1999	Janie Dee	Comic Potential	

2000s

Year	Recipient	Work
2000	Victoria Hamilton	As You Like It
2001	Lindsay Duncan	Mouth to Mouth and Private Lives
2002	Clare Higgins	Vincent in Brixton
2003	Eve Best	Mourning Becomes Electra
2004	Victoria Hamilton	Suddenly Last Summer
2005	Eve Best	Hedda Gabler
2006	Kathleen Turner	Who's Afraid of Virginia Woolf?
2007	Anne-Marie Duff	Saint Joan
2008	Margaret Tyzack	The Chalk Garden
2009	Rachel Weisz	A Streetcar Named Desire

2010s

Year	Recipient	Work	Ref
2010	Jenny Jules	Ruined	
2011	Sheridan Smith	Flare Path	
2012	Hattie Morahan	A Doll's House	
2013	Lesley Manville	Ghosts	
2014	Helen McCrory	Medea	
2015	Denise Gough	People, Places and Things	
2016	Billie Piper	Yerma	
2017	Victoria Hamilton	Albion	
2018	Patsy Ferran	Summer and Smoke	
2019	Sharon D Clarke	Death of a Salesman	
2019	Juliet Stevenson	The Doctor	

2020s

Year	Recipient	Work	Ref
2022	Jessie Buckley	Cabaret	
2023	Patsy Ferran	A Streetcar Named Desire	
2024	Sophie Okonedo	Medea	
2025	Lesley Manville	Oedipus	
2026	Rosamund Pike	Inter Alia	

=== Best Designer ===
1980s

Year	Recipient	Work	Ref
1982	John Gunter	The Beggar's Opera and Guys and Dolls	
1982	Grant Hicks	The Double Man and True West	
1983	Voytek	Great and Small	
1984	Alison Chitty	Venice Preserved	
1985	William Dudley	The Critic, The Merry Wives of Windsor, Mutiny, The Mysteries and The Real Inspector Hound	
1986	Ezio Frigerio	The House of Bernarda Alba	
1986	Maria Björnson	The Phantom of the Opera	
1987	Maria Björnson	Follies	
1987	Michael Taylor	Attractions	
1988	Richard Hudson	The Old Vic season	
1989	John Napier	Miss Saigon	

1990s

Year	Recipient	Work	Ref
1990	Mark Thompson	The Wind in the Willows	
1991	Bob Crowley	Murmuring Judges	
1992	Ian MacNeil	An Inspector Calls	
1993	Ian MacNeil	Machinal	
1994	Mark Thompson	The Kitchen	
1995	Robin Don	The Winter Guest	
1996	Robert Innes Hopkins	The Comedy of Errors and The Weavers	
1997	John Napier	Peter Pan, or The Boy Who Wouldn't Grow Up	
1998	Phelim McDermott, Julian Crouch and Graeme Gilmour	Shockheaded Peter	
1998	Richard Hoover	Not About Nightingales	
1999	Julie Taymor and Richard Hudson	The Lion King	

2000s

Year	Recipient	Work	Ref
2000	Paul Brown	Coriolanus, Richard II and The Tempest	
2001	Paul Brown	Platonov	
2002	William Dudley	The Coast of Utopia	
2003	Bob Crowley	Mourning Becomes Electra	
2004	Christopher Oram	Suddenly Last Summer	
2005	Timothy Bird and David Farley	Sunday in the Park with George	
2006	Punchdrunk Company	Faust	
2007	Rae Smith and Handspring Puppet Company	War Horse	
2008	Neil Murray	Brief Encounter	
2009	Christopher Oram	Red	

2010s

Year	Recipient	Work	Ref
2010	Bunny Christie	The White Guard	
2011	Mark Tildesley	Frankenstein	
2012	Miriam Buether	Wild Swans	
2013	Es Devlin	Chimerica	
2014	Es Devlin	The Nether	
2015	Anna Fleischle	Hangmen	
2016	Christine Jones	Harry Potter and the Cursed Child	
2017	Vicki Mortimer	Follies	
2018	Bunny Christie	Company	
2019	Tom Scutt	A Very Expensive Poison	

2020s

Year	Recipient	Work	Ref
2022	Tom Scutt	Cabaret	
2023	Tom Pye	My Neighbour Totoro	
2024	Miriam Buether and 59 Productions	Stranger Things: The First Shadow	
2025	Frankie Bradshaw	Ballet Shoes and Dear Octopus	
2026	Tom Scutt	Into the Woods	

=== Best Director ===
1980s

Year	Recipient	Work	Ref
1982	James Roose-Evans	84, Charing Cross Road	
1983	Terry Hands	Cyrano de Bergerac (classical)	
1983	Giles Havergal	Men Should Weep (modern)	
1984	Peter Gill	Fool for Love and Venice Preserved	
1985	Bill Bryden	The Mysteries	
1986	Mike Alfreds	The Cherry Orchard	
1987	Declan Donnellan	Twelfth Night	
1988	Peter Brook	The Mahabharata	
1989	Nicholas Hytner	Ghetto and Miss Saigon	

1990s

Year	Recipient	Work	Ref
1990	Peter Hall	The Wild Duck	
1990	Robert Lepage	Tectonic Plates	
1991	Trevor Nunn	Timon of Athens	
1992	Stephen Daldry	An Inspector Calls	
1993	Terry Hands	Tamburlaine the Great	
1994	Sean Mathias	Design for Living and Les Parents terribles	
1995	Sam Mendes	The Glass Menagerie	
1996	Richard Eyre	Guys and Dolls and John Gabriel Borkman	
1997	Richard Eyre	The Invention of Love and King Lear	
1998	Howard Davies	Flight and The Iceman Cometh	
1999	Trevor Nunn	The Merchant of Venice and Summerfolk	

2000s

Year	Recipient	Work	Ref
2000	Michael Grandage	As You Like It, Merrily We Roll Along and Passion Play	
2001	Robert Lepage	The Far Side of the Moon	
2002	Sam Mendes	Twelfth Night and Uncle Vanya	
2003	Howard Davies	Mourning Becomes Electra	
2004	Rufus Norris	Festen	
2005	Michael Grandage	The Wild Duck	
2006	John Tiffany	Black Watch	
2007	Rupert Goold	Macbeth	
2008	Michael Grandage	The Chalk Garden and Ivanov	
2009	Rupert Goold	Enron	

2010s

Year	Recipient	Work	Ref
2010	Michael Grandage	King Lear	
2010	Thea Sharrock	After the Dance	
2011	Mike Leigh	Grief	
2012	Benedict Andrews	Three Sisters	
2013	Lyndsey Turner	Chimerica	
2014	Ivo van Hove	A View from the Bridge	
2015	Robert Icke	Oresteia	
2016	John Tiffany	Harry Potter and the Cursed Child	
2017	Dominic Cooke	Follies	
2018	Stephen Daldry	The Inheritance	
2019	Jamie Lloyd	Betrayal, Cyrano de Bergerac and Evita	

2020s

Year	Recipient	Work	Ref
2022	Rebecca Frecknall	Cabaret	
2023	Lynette Linton	Blues for an Alabama Sky	
2024	Rupert Goold	Dear England	
2025	Robert Icke	Oedipus	
2026	Ivo van Hove	All My Sons	

=== Best Musical ===
Known as the 'Peter Hepple Award' from 2016 onwards.

1980s

Year	Work	Ref
1982	Guys and Dolls	
1983	Blood Brothers	
1984	On Your Toes	
1985	Me and My Girl	
1986	Chess	
1987	Follies	
1988	South Pacific	
1989	Miss Saigon	

1990s

Year	Work
1990	Into the Woods
1991	Carmen Jones
1992	Assassins
1993	City of Angels
1994	She Loves Me
1995	Company
1996	Guys and Dolls
1997	Chicago
1998	Oklahoma!
1999	Spend Spend Spend

2000s

Year	Work
2000	The Beautiful Game
2001	Kiss Me, Kate
2002	Anything Goes
2003	Jerry Springer: The Opera
2004	The Producers
2005	Billy Elliot the Musical
2006	Caroline, or Change
2007	Hairspray
2008	La Cage Aux Folles
2009	Spring Awakening

2010s

Year	Work	Ref
2010	Matilda the Musical	
2011	London Road	
2012	Merrily We Roll Along	
2013	The Scottsboro Boys	
2014	Gypsy	
2015	Bend It Like Beckham: The Musical	
2016	Groundhog Day	
2017	Hamilton	
2018	Company	
2019	Come From Away	

2020s

Year	Work	Ref
2022	Spring Awakening	
2023	Oklahoma!	
2024	Guys and Dolls	
2025	Fiddler on the Roof	
2026	Paddington the Musical	

=== Best New Play ===
1980s

Year	Recipient	Writer	Ref
1982	A Kind of Alaska	Harold Pinter	
1983	no award	no award	
1984	One for the Road	Harold Pinter	
1985	A Chorus of Disapproval	Alan Ayckbourn	
1986	Road	Jim Cartwright	
1987	Curtains	Stephen Bill	
1987	Fashion	Doug Lucie	
1988	The Secret Rapture	David Hare	
1989	Ghetto	Joshua Sobol	

1990s

Year	Recipient	Writer
1990	Racing Demon	David Hare
1991	Three Birds Alighting on a Field	Timberlake Wertenbaker
1992	Angels in America	Tony Kushner
1993	Arcadia	Tom Stoppard
1994	Dead Funny	Terry Johnson
1995	The Steward of Christendom	Sebastian Barry
1996	Blinded by the Sun	Stephen Poliakoff
1997	Closer	Patrick Marber
1998	Copenhagen	Michael Frayn
1999	Mnemonic	Simon McBurney

2000s

Year	Recipient	Writer
2000	Blue/Orange	Joe Penhall
2001	Humble Boy	Charlotte Jones
2002	The York Realist	Peter Gill
2003	Democracy	Michael Frayn
2004	The History Boys	Alan Bennett
2005	Harvest	Richard Bean
2006	Rock'n'Roll	Tom Stoppard
2007	A Disappearing Number	Simon McBurney and Complicité
2008	August: Osage County	Tracy Letts
2009	Jerusalem	Jez Butterworth

2010s

Year	Recipient	Writer	Ref
2010	Clybourne Park	Bruce Norris	
2011	One Man, Two Guvnors	Richard Bean	
2012	The Effect	Lucy Prebble	
2013	Chimerica	Lucy Kirkwood	
2014	King Charles III	Mike Bartlett	
2015	Hangmen	Martin McDonagh	
2016	The Flick	Annie Baker	
2017	The Ferryman	Jez Butterworth	
2018	The Inheritance	Matthew Lopez	
2019	A Very Expensive Poison	Lucy Prebble	

2020s

Year	Recipient	Writer	Ref
2022	Best of Enemies	James Graham	
2023	Patriots	Peter Morgan	
2024	The Motive and the Cue	Jack Thorne	
2025	Giant	Mark Rosenblatt	
2026	Punch	James Graham	

=== Best Shakespearean Performance ===
Known as the 'John and Wendy Trewin Award' from 2000 until 2015, and 'The Trewin Award' from 2016 onwards.

2000s

Year	Recipient	Work	Ref
2000	Simon Russell Beale	Hamlet	
2001	Samuel West	Hamlet	
2002	Mark Rylance	Twelfth Night	
2003	Greg Hicks	Coriolanus	
2004	Paul Rhys	Measure for Measure	
2005	Kevin Spacey	Richard II	
2006	Tamsin Greig	Much Ado About Nothing	
2007	Chiwetel Ejiofor	Othello	
2007	Patrick Stewart	Macbeth	
2008	Derek Jacobi	Twelfth Night	
2008	David Tennant	Hamlet	
2009	Jude Law	Hamlet	

2010s

Year	Recipient	Work	Ref
2010	Derek Jacobi	King Lear	
2011	Eddie Redmayne	Richard II	
2012	Simon Russell Beale	Timon of Athens	
2013	Rory Kinnear	Othello	
2014	Antony Sher	Henry IV	
2015	Judi Dench	The Winter's Tale	
2016	Glenda Jackson	King Lear	
2017	Andrew Scott	Hamlet	
2018	Sophie Okonedo	Antony and Cleopatra	
2019	Hammed Animashaun	A Midsummer Night's Dream	

2020s

Year	Recipient	Work	Ref
2022	Cush Jumbo	Hamlet	
2023	Arthur Hughes	Richard III	
2024	David Tennant	Macbeth	
2025	Danny Sapani	King Lear	
2026	Hayley Atwell	Much Ado About Nothing	

=== Most Promising Newcomer ===
Known as the 'Jack Tinker Award' from 1996 onwards.

1980s

Year	Recipient	Work	Ref
1989	Sam Mendes	Artistic direction at the Minerva Theatre, Chichester	
1989	Julia Ormond	Faith, Hope and Charity	

1990s

Year	Recipient	Work
1990	Sara Crow	Private Lives
1991	Lia Williams	The Revengers' Comedies
1992	Rufus Sewell	Making It Better
1993	Emma Fielding	Arcadia and The School for Wives
1994	Rachel Weisz	Design for Living
1995	Victoria Hamilton	The Master Builder and Retreat
1996	James Callis	Old Wicked Songs
1997	Liza Walker	Closer
1998	Mick Gordon	Gate Theatre, London
1999	Eve Best	'Tis Pity She's a Whore

2000s

Year	Recipient	Work
2000	Chiwetel Ejiofor	Blue/Orange
2001	Lyndsey Marshal	Boston Marriage and Redundant
2002	Alison Pargeter	Damsels in Distress
2003	Lisa Dillon	Iphigenia and The Master Builder
2004	Eddie Redmayne	The Goat, or Who is Sylvia?
2005	Mariah Gale	'Tis Pity She's a Whore
2006	Andrew Garfield	Citizenship and The Overwhelming
2007	Leanne Jones	Hairspray
2008	Ella Smith	Fat Pig
2009	Tom Sturridge	Punk Rock

2010s

Year	Recipient	Work	Ref
2010	Daniel Kaluuya	Sucker Punch	
2011	Blanche McIntyre	Accolade and Foxfinder	
2012	Denise Gough	Desire Under the Elms and Our New Girl	
2013	Kate O'Flynn	Port	
2014	Patsy Ferran	Blithe Spirit and Treasure Island	
2015	David Moorst	Violence and Son	
2016	Anthony Boyle	Harry Potter and the Cursed Child	
2017	Sheila Atim	Girl From the North Country	
2017	John McCrea	Everybody’s Talking About Jamie	
2018	Chris Walley	The Lieutenant of Inishmore	
2019	Sam Tutty	Dear Evan Hansen	

2020s

Year	Recipient	Work	Ref
2022	Samuel Creasy	The Book of Dust: La Belle Sauvage	
2022	Stuart Thompson	Spring Awakening	
2023	Lizzie Annis	The Glass Menagerie	
2024	Louis McCartney	Stranger Things: The First Shadow	
2024	Jack Wolfe	Next to Normal	
2025	Francesca Amewudah-Rivers	Romeo and Juliet	
2026	Ruby Ashbourne Serkis	Indian Ink	

=== Most Promising Playwright ===
1980s

Year	Recipient	Work	Ref
1989	Stephen Jeffreys	Valued Friends	

1990s

Year	Recipient	Work
1990	Clare McIntyre	My Heart's a Suitcase
1991	Rona Munro	Bold Girls
1992	Philip Ridley	The Fastest Clock in the Universe
1993	Simon Donald	Theatre of Stuff
1994	Kevin Elyot	My Night With Reg
1995	Jez Butterworth	Mojo
1996	Martin McDonagh	The Beauty Queen of Leenane
1997	Conor McPherson	The Weir
1998	Rebecca Prichard	Yard Gal
1999	Charlotte Jones	Martha, Josie and the Chinese Elvis

2000s

Year	Recipient	Work
2000	Joanna Laurens	The Three Birds
2001	Gregory Burke	Gagarin Way
2002	Charlotte Eilenberg	The Lucky Ones
2003	Lucy Prebble	The Sugar Syndrome
2004	Rebecca Lenkiewicz	The Night Season
2005	Laura Wade	Breathing Corpses and Colder Than Here
2006	Nina Raine	Rabbit
2007	Polly Stenham	That Face
2008	Alexi Kaye Campbell	The Pride
2009	Alia Bano	Shades

2010s

Year	Recipient	Work	Ref
2010	Anya Reiss	Spur of the Moment	
2011	Tom Wells	The Kitchen Sink	
2012	Lolita Chakrabarti	Red Velvet	
2013	Rory Kinnear	The Herd	
2013	Phoebe Waller-Bridge	Fleabag	
2014	Barney Norris	Visitors	
2015	James Fritz	Four Minutes Twelve Seconds	
2016	Charlene James	Cuttin’ It	
2017	Branden Jacobs-Jenkins	Gloria and An Octoroon	
2018	Natasha Gordon	Nine Night	
2019	Jasmine Lee-Jones	Seven Methods of Killing Kylie Jenner	

2020s

Year	Recipient	Work	Ref
2022	Igor Memic	Old Bridge	
2022	Zadie Smith	The Wife of Willesden	
2023	Tyrell Williams	Red Pitch	
2024	Marcelo Dos Santos	Backstairs Billy	
2024	Matilda Feyiṣayọ Ibini	Sleepova	
2025	Mark Rosenblatt	Giant	
2026	Ava Pickett	1536	

=== Special awards ===
==== 1980s ====
From 1982 to 1988, the category was simply known as the Special Award. The recipients were:

Year	Recipient(s)	Ref
1982	Robert David MacDonald and Citizens Theatre, Glasgow	
1983	Market Theatre (Johannesburg), for Woza Albert!	
1984	Graeae Theatre Company and The Theatre of Comedy Company	
1985	Kick Theatre Company and Deborah Warner	
1986	Bush Theatre	
1987	Thelma Holt, for the International Festival at the National Theatre	
1987	Michael Pennington and Michael Bogdanov, for The Henry Trilogy	
1988	Kenneth Branagh, David Parfitt, of the Renaissance Theatre Company	
1988	Sir Michael Hordern	

==== 2010s ====
The Special Award was reintroduced in 2017, with the following winners between then and 2019:

Year	Winner(s)	Notes	Refs
2017	David Lan	Commendation for artistic direction at the Young Vic	
2018	Neil McPherson	Commendation for artistic direction at the Finborough Theatre	
2019	Paule Constable	Commendation for lighting design	

==== 2020s ====
In 2022, Special Awards were conferred upon venues or individuals recognised for exceptional theatre-making during the COVID-19 lockdown. The winners were:

- Jermyn Street Theatre
- National Theatre
- Nica Burns
- The Old Vic
- Original Theatre Company

From 2023, the special award category has been named The Empty Space... Peter Brook Award for an innovative venue. The winners were:

Year	Winner	Refs
2023	New Diorama Theatre	
2024	Orange Tree Theatre	
2025	The Yard Theatre	
2026	Red Rose Chain Theatre Company	

== See also ==
- Laurence Olivier Awards
- Black British Theatre Awards
- Standard Theatre Awards
- Ian Charleson Awards
- The Offies
- WhatsOnStage Awards
- Critics' Awards for Theatre in Scotland
- Theatre Book Prize
- UK Theatre Awards
