= Trewin =

Trewin is a surname. Notable people with the surname include:

== People ==
- Dennis Trewin AO (born 1946), Australian former public servant, head of the Australian Bureau of Statistics
- Ion Trewin (1943–2015), British editor, publisher and author
- J. C. Trewin OBE (1908–1990), British journalist, writer and drama critic
- Kai Trewin (born 2001), Australian professional footballer
- Max Trewin (1927–2005), Australian rules footballer
- Morris Trewin, Canadian retired ice hockey goaltender
- Shari Trewin, computer scientist
- Todd Trewin (born 1958), American equestrian
- Tom Trewin (1914–1992), Australian politician
- Wendy Trewin (Wendy Monk) (1915–2000), English writer and critic

== Other ==
- Trewin Brothers, a Watford, UK department store bought by national retail giant John Lewis & Partners in 1970 and closed in 2020
