= Anna Mackmin =

British theatre director (born 1964)

Anna Mackmin (born 1964) is a British theatre director. She has been an associate director at the Sheffield Crucible and at the Gate Theatre in London.

== Early life and education ==
Mackmin was born in Leeds. Mackmin's sister, Scarlett Mackmin, is a choreographer also working in London theatre.

In the mid-1980s, Mackmin attended the Central School of Speech and Drama, studying acting.

== Career ==
Dissatisfied with her acting career, she became a clothing designer at one point and set up a business with her sister in London's Soho.

Mackmin was friends with the actress and writer Charlotte Jones, and it was Jones' first play, Airswimming, that provided Mackmin with her directorial debut in 1997. Later, in 2003, Michael Grandage offered her the position of associate director at the Crucible Theatre in Sheffield. There she scored notable successes with Arthur Miller's The Crucible and Caryl Churchill's Cloud Nine, earning her the 2004 TMA Award for best director.

Mackmin has worked repeatedly with Charlotte Jones since their joint debut, directing Jones' plays In Flame, The Dark and The Lightning Play. She has also collaborated several times with Amelia Bullmore, whom she originally directed as an actress in The Crucible in 2004. Since then, she has directed Bullmore's plays Mammals and Di and Viv and Rose, together with her adaptation of Ibsen's Ghosts.

In 2006, Mackmin staged an acclaimed triple-bill at the National Theatre, entitled Burn/Chatroom/Citizenship. In the spring of 2007, she again won plaudits, this time for her direction of Dying for It, Moira Buffini's 'free adaptation' of Nikolai Erdman's The Suicide. She then directed Toby Stephens in a revival of Tom Stoppard's The Real Thing at London's Old Vic Theatre from April through June 2010, and, at the same venue in 2012, Sheridan Smith in Hedda Gabler.

Her own first play, Back Stroke, directed by herself, was staged at the Donmar Warehouse in 2025, starring Tamsin Greig and Celia Imrie.

Woman’s Hour: Olivier award-winning actors Celia Imrie and Tamsin Greig joined Nuala McGovern in the Woman’s Hour studio. Celia spoke to Nuala about her relationship with her mother and how she wishes she’d savoured the time with her more. You can listen to the full interview on the BBC Sounds app - it’s the Woman’s Hour episode from 25 February.

https://www.bbc.co.uk/programmes/m00289p0

Backstroke was the Radio Times play of the year 2025

Reviews: ★★★★ “Anna Mackmin’s witty, heartfelt and immaculately acted portrait of a lifelong mother-daughter relationship” Theatre Cat ★★★★ "Celia Imrie is mesmerising … Tamsin Greig also delivers a wonderful performance in Anna Mackmin’s ferociously unsentimental play" The Times ★★★★ “Stays with you long after you leave the theatre behind” Radio Times ★★★★ “An extraordinary play about a mother and daughter relationship” The Arts Desk

== Screen acting credits ==
- 1992: Coronation Street – one episode as Sister Lancaster
- 1993: Minder – one episode as receptionist
- 1993: The Chief – two episodes as June Robbins

== Plays directed ==
- 1997: Airswimming by Charlotte Jones at Battersea Arts Centre (London)
- 1999: In Flame by Charlotte Jones at Bush Theatre (London)
- 2000: In Flame by Charlotte Jones at Ambassadors Theatre (London)
- 2001: The Arbor by Andrea Dunbar at Crucible Theatre (Sheffield)
- 2002: Auntie & Me by Morris Panych at Assembly Rooms (Edinburgh)
- 2002: Teeth 'n' Smiles by David Hare at Crucible Theatre (Sheffield)
- 2003: Auntie & Me by Morris Panych at Wyndhams Theatre (London)
- 2003: Iphigenia by Euripides (adapted by Edna O'Brien) at Crucible Theatre (Sheffield)
- 2003: Food Chain by Mick Mahoney at Royal Court Theatre (London)
- 2004: The Crucible by Arthur Miller at Crucible Theatre (Sheffield)
- 2004: The Dark by Charlotte Jones at Donmar Warehouse (London)
- 2004: Cloud Nine by Caryl Churchill at Crucible Theatre (Sheffield)
- 2005: Breathing Corpses by Laura Wade at Royal Court Theatre (London)
- 2005: Mammals by Amelia Bullmore at Bush Theatre (London)
- 2006: Burn / Chatroom / Citizenship at National Theatre (London)
- 2006: The Lightning Play by Charlotte Jones at Almeida Theatre (London)
- 2007: Dying for It by Moira Buffini and Nikolai Erdman at Almeida Theatre (London)
- 2007: Ghosts by Henrik Ibsen (adapted by Amelia Bullmore) at Gate Theatre (London)
- 2008: Under the Blue Sky by David Eldridge at Duke of York's Theatre (London)
- 2009: 24 Hour Plays, The Old Vic (London)
- 2009: Dancing at Lughnasa by Brian Friel at The Old Vic (London)
- 2010: The Real Thing by Tom Stoppard at The Old Vic (London)
- 2010: Really Old, Like Forty Five by Tamsin Oglesby at National Theatre (London)
- 2010: Me And My Girl by Noel Gay at Crucible Theatre (Sheffield)
- 2012: Hedda Gabler by Henrik Ibsen at The Old Vic (London)
- 2011: Di and Viv and Rose by Amelia Bullmore at Hampstead Downstairs (London)
- 2013: Di and Viv and Rose by Amelia Bullmore at Hampstead Theatre (London)
- 2015: Di and Viv and Rose by Amelia Bullmore at Vaudeville Theatre (London)
- 2022: Woman in Mind by Alan Ayckbourn at Chichester Festival Theatre
- 2024: The Divine Mrs S. by April De Angelis at Hampstead Theatre (London)
- 2025: Back Stroke by Anna Mackmin at Donmar Warehouse (London)

== Bibliography ==
- Devoured (Propolis, 2018)
