= Scarlett Mackmin =

English choreographer

Scarlett Mackmin is a British choreographer. She trained in New York City and at the Laban Centre for Movement and Dance in London.

Scarlett has choreographed for commercials such as Chanel's (Gabrielle) Promo and for Music Videos including Massive Attack, Young Fathers (Voodoo in my Blood).

Her film and Television credits include Empire of Light, Allelujah, The Crown, The Wheel of Time, A Private War, A United Kingdom, The Imitation Game, Dancing on the Edge, The King's Speech, Trust, Taboo, Cemetery Junction, Stage Beauty, Chocolat, The Last Minute, and Miss Julie.

Scarlett has also Choreographed Don Carlo at The Royal Opera House and its multiple revivals.

Her work for the theatre includes The Ferryman (The Royal Court London/ West End/ Broadway), Di and Viv and Rose (Hampstead Theatre/ West End), Silver Tassie (National Theatre), Liola (National Theatre), Private Lives (West End/ New York/ Toronto), London Assurance (National Theatre), Welcome to Thebes (National Theatre), Arcadia (West End), Burnt by the Sun (National Theatre), Dancing at Lughnasa (Old Vic), Under the Blue Sky (West End),The Hypochondriac (Almeida), President of an Empty Room (National Theatre), Sleeping Beauty (Barbican), The Dark, Caligula (Donmar Warehouse), After Miss Julie, Privates on Parade (Donmar Warehouse), Cloud Nine (Sheffield Theatre), Cloud Nine (Almeida), In Celebration (West End), Dying for It (Almeida), A Midsummer Night's Dream, The Tempest, Bird Calls, Iphigenia (Sheffield Crucible), Peribanez (Young Vic), I.D. (Almeida/ BBC4), Sleeping Beauty (Young Vic/ Barbican/ New York), A Midsummer Night's Dream, The Merry Wives of Windsor (RSC at Old Vic/ U.S. Tour) The Two Gentlemen of Verona (Regent's Park), Up on the Roof (Minerva, Chichester), In Flame (Bush Theatre/New Ambassadors) and Airswimming (BAC).

She is the sister of theatre director Anna Mackmin.
