= Pearson Playwrights' Scheme =

Pearson Playwrights' Scheme (formerly Thames Television Theatre Writers Scheme) is a British organisation established in 1973 to support theatre writing. It runs the Pearson Award for Best New Play.

== History ==
In 1973, Howard Thomas, then managing director of Thames Television, launched the Thames Television Theatre Writers Scheme to support and celebrate new writing in the theatre. He believed that television owed much to the theatre for its supply of creative talent. In 1993 Pearson PLC took over the sponsorship of the scheme and it became the Pearson Playwrights' Scheme. Over the past 30 years, the scheme has helped launch some of the finest British play-writing talent. Each year, bursaries are awarded to new writers and an additional award is offered to the writer of the best play. These are selected by the scheme's panel, chaired by Sir John Mortimer CBE QC. The awards are called the Pearson Award for Best New Play.

Since 2014 the scheme has been sponsored by Channel 4.

== Panel and patrons ==
The panel has included Michael Billington, Thelma Holt, Sue Summers, Catherine Johnson, Beryl Bainbridge and John Tydeman.

Patrons include Sir Alan Ayckbourn, Alan Bleasdale, Stephen Daldry, Dame Judi Dench, Sir Richard Eyre, Sir Peter Hall, Sir Jeremy Isaacs, Joan Plowright, Sir Tom Stoppard and Sue Townsend.

The scheme is administrated by Jack Andrews, and is supported by The Peggy Ramsay Foundation and The Olivier Foundation.

== Pearson Award for Best New Play ==
Winners of the Pearson Award for Best New Play, awarded annually since 1982.

- 1982 Borderline by Hanif Kureishi (Royal Court Theatre)
- 1983 True Dare Kiss by Debbie Horsfield (Liverpool Playhouse)
- 1984 No award given
- 1985 Particular Friendships by Martin Allen (Hampstead Theatre)
- 1986 The Boys from Hibernia by Mark Power (Belgrave Theatre, Coventry)
- 1987 Dreams of San Francisco by Jacqueline Holborough (Bush Theatre)
- 1988 No award given
- 1989 Poor Beast in the Rain by Billy Roche (Bush Theatre)
- 1990 The Pool of Bethesda by Allan Cubitt (Guildhall School)
- 1991 Talking in Tongues by Winsome Pinnock (Royal Court Theatre) & Dead Sheep by Catherine Johnson (Bush Theatre)
- 1992 Worlds Apart by Paul Sirett (Theatre Royal, Stratford)
- 1993 No award given

Scheme taken over from Thames by Pearson.

- 1994 Uganda by Judith Johnson (Royal National Theatre)
- 1995 Pale Horse by Joe Penhall (Royal National Theatre)
- 1996 The Cripple of Inishmaan by Martin McDonagh (Royal National Theatre)
- 1997 Nabokov's Gloves by Peter Moffat (Warehouse Theatre)
- 1998 Martha, Josie & the Chinese Elvis by Charlotte Jones (Octagon Theatre, Bolton)
- 1999 Trust by Gary Mitchell (Royal National Theatre)
- 2000 Normal by Helen Blakeman (Bush Theatre)
- 2001 Port by Simon Stephens (Royal Exchange Theatre, Manchester)
- 2002 Drowned World by Gary Owen (Paines Plough) & Honeymoon Suite by Richard Bean (Royal National Theatre)
- 2003 The Straits by Gregory Burke (Royal National Theatre)
- 2004 All the Ordinary Angels by Nick Leather (Royal Exchange Theatre, Manchester)
- 2005 Breathing Corpses by Laura Wade (Finborough Theatre). Play produced at the Royal Court Theatre.
- 2006 Whipping It Up by Steve Thompson (Bush Theatre)
