= Colder Than Here =

2005 play by Laura Wade

Colder Than Here is the debut play by the British playwright Laura Wade. It premiered in 2005 at the Soho Theatre directed by Abigail Morris. The comedy explores a woman dying of bone cancer and her family coming to terms with her impending death.

Wade's other play concerning death, Breathing Corpses, also premiered that year and the two works jointly won the writer the Critics' Circle Theatre Award for Most Promising Playwright and an Olivier Award nomination for Outstanding Achievement in an Affiliate Theatre.

The play has been subsequently produced off-Broadway by MCC Theater, New York in 2005, by Belvoir Theatre Company, Sydney in 2005, in Darmstadt in 2006, in Stockholm in 2006 and 2007, and in Mexico in 2017.
