= Home, I'm Darling =

Play by Laura Wade

- Original language: English
- Written by: Laura Wade
- Characters: Judy; Alex; Johnny; Sylvia; Fran; Marcus

Premiere
- Date: 25 June 2018
- Place: Theatr Clwyd

Home, I'm Darling is a play by British playwright Laura Wade. Since its 2018 debut at Theatr Clwyd, the play has been performed in the West End and toured the UK, as well new productions in Australia and northern England. It has won several awards.

== Plot summary ==
Judy and Johnny lead a 50s lifestyle, clothes, décor, appliances. She stays at home while Johnny works as an estate agent. He hopes for a promotion. He realises they have financial problems; the house might be repossessed. Three years earlier Judy had taken voluntary redundancy, but the money has run out. He is underperforming at work and doesn’t earn as much commission. He says he isn’t happy. They need to change. He gets a promotion, but it will involve a long commute. They agree to compromise.

== Production history ==
Home, I'm Darling is a 2018 play by British playwright Laura Wade.

=== Theatr Clwyd/National Theatre production ===
The play made its world premiere at Theatr Clwyd from 25 June to 14 July 2018, before transferring to the Dorfman Theatre at the National Theatre, London from 24 July to 5 September. The production was directed by Tamara Harvey and starred Katherine Parkinson as Judy. On 31 August, National Theatre artistic director Rufus Norris stepped in to play Johnny after Richard Harrington was left indisposed.

After the original production, it transferred to the Duke of York's Theatre in London's West End from 26 January to 13 April 2019, before embarking on a UK tour to the Theatre Royal, Bath, and The Lowry, Salford, before returning to Theatr Clwyd.

The production toured again in spring 2023 starring Jessica Ransom as Judy, Neil McDermott as Johnny and Diane Keen as Sylvia.

=== Australian productions ===
The play made its Australian premiere at the Melbourne Theatre Company from 20 January to 29 February 2020 at the Southbank Theatre, The Summer, directed by Sarah Goodes and starring Nikki Shiels as Judy.

A production at the Sydney Theatre Company opened at the Drama Theatre at the Sydney Opera House in from 6 April to 15 May 2021, directed by Jessica Arthur and starring Andrea Demetriades as Judy. It was originally due to open in April 2020, however due to the COVID-19 pandemic the production was postponed.

=== UK Northern tour 2021 ===
The play made its regional debut in the UK in 2021. The production was directed by Liz Stevenson, in a co-production between the Stephen Joseph Theatre in Scarborough, the Octagon in Bolton and Theatre by the Lake in Keswick. The production was in the round, the first time the play had been performed in this configuration.

== Cast and characters ==
Character	Theatr Clwyd / National Theatre	West End	UK tour	Melbourne	Sydney	UK tour	UK tour
Character	2018	2019	2019	2020	2021	2021	2023
Judy	Katherine Parkinson	Katherine Parkinson	Katherine Parkinson	Nikki Shiels	Andrea Demetriades	Sandy Foster	Jessica Ransom
Johnny	Richard Harrington	Richard Harrington	Jo Stone-Fewings	Toby Truslove	Anthony Taufa	Tom Kanji	Neil McDermott
Sylvia	Sian Thomas	Susan Brown	Susan Brown	Jane Turner	Tracy Mann	Susan Twist	Diane Keen
Alex	Sara Gregory	Sara Gregory	Sara Gregory	Izabella Yena	Kirsty Marillier	Sophie Mercell	Shanez Pattni
Fran	Kathryn Drysdale	Siubhan Harrison	Siubhan Harrison	Susie Youssef	Chantelle Jamieson	Vicky Binns	Cassie Bradley
Marcus	Barnaby Kay	Hywel Morgan	Hywel Morgan	Peter Paltos	Gareth Davies	Sam Jenkins-Shaw	Matthew Douglas

== Awards and nominations ==
=== Original UK/West End production ===
Year	Award	Category	Nominee	Result
2018	UK Theatre Award	Best New Play	Laura Wade	Nominated
2018	BroadwayWorld UK Award	Best Actress in a New Production of a Play	Katherine Parkinson	Nominated
2019	Laurence Olivier Award	Best New Comedy		Won
2019	Laurence Olivier Award	Best Actress in a Play	Katherine Parkinson	Nominated
2019	Laurence Olivier Award	Best Actress in a Supporting Role	Susan Brown	Nominated
2019	Laurence Olivier Award	Best Set Design	Anna Fleischle	Nominated
2019	Laurence Olivier Award	Best Costume Design	Anna Fleischle	Nominated
2019	WhatsOnStage Award	Best Actress in a Play	Katherine Parkinson	Nominated
2019	WhatsOnStage Award	Best Supporting Actress in a Play	Sian Thomas	Nominated
