= Joshua McGuire =

British television, film and stage actor (born 1987)

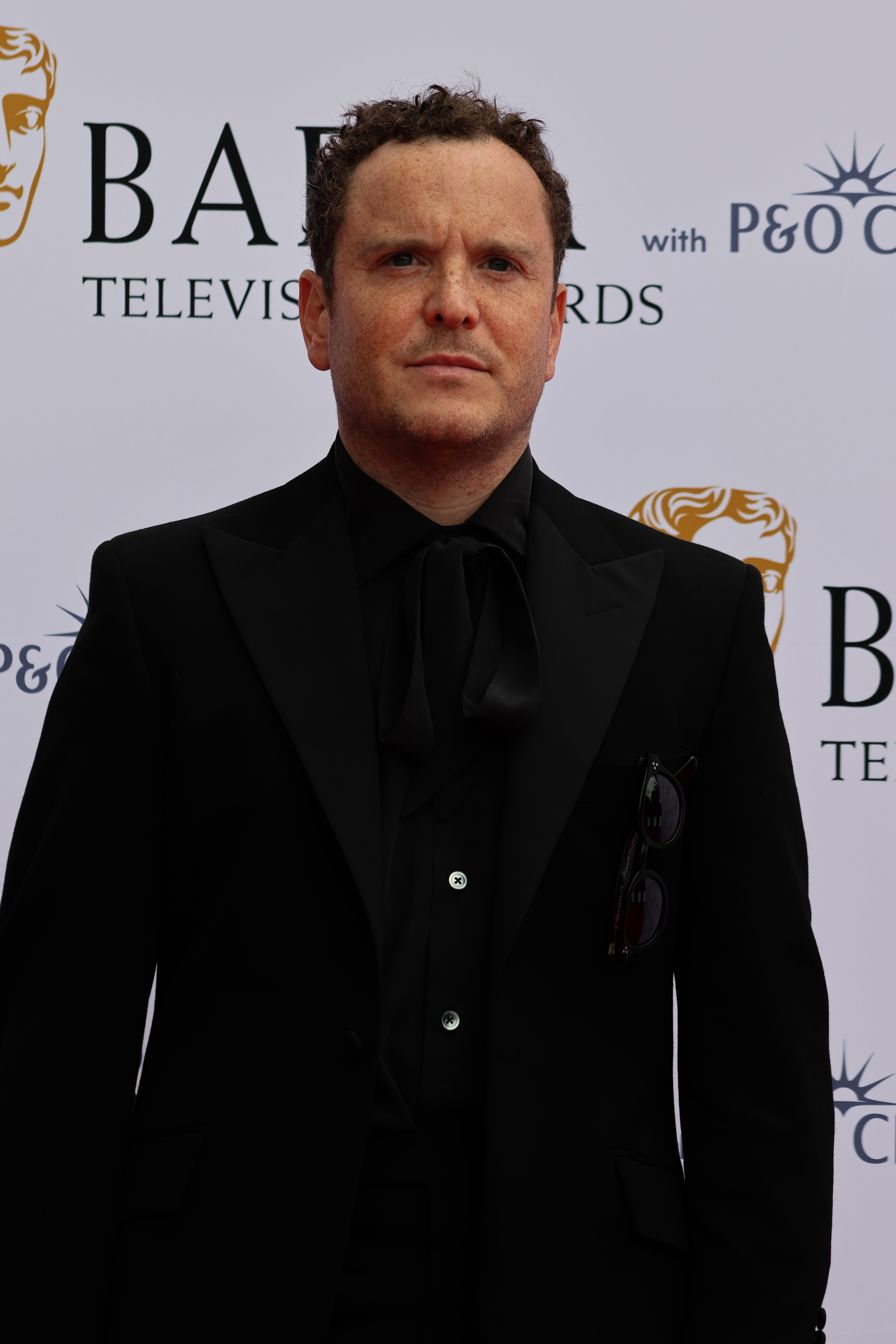
- McGuire at the 2026 British Academy Television Awards
- Born: 10 April 1987 (age 39)
- Education: Warwick School, Warwickshire
- Alma mater: Royal Academy of Dramatic Art (RADA)
- Occupation: Actor
- Years active: 2010–present
- Known for: Lovesick (Channel 4/Netflix); Amadeus (Chichester Festival Theatre); Privacy (Donmar Warehouse); The Bleak Old Shop of Stuff (BBC Two); The Hour (BBC Two); Posh (Royal Court Theatre)

Joshua McGuire (born 10 April 1987) is a British actor. Known for his work on stage and screen, his breakthrough was in the role of Angus in the Channel 4/Netflix comedy series Lovesick (formerly Scrotal Recall). He starred opposite Daniel Radcliffe in Rosencrantz and Guildenstern Are Dead at The Old Vic. He portrayed Briar Cudgeon in the film Artemis Fowl (2020).

== Early life and education ==
McGuire was born in 1987 and brought up in the town of Warwick in Warwickshire. McGuire was educated at Warwick School, a boarding and day independent school for boys in his home town, followed by the Royal Academy of Dramatic Art, in Bloomsbury in Central London, from which he graduated with a BA (Hons) in Acting.

== Life and career ==
Prior to graduation, McGuire had been a member of Playbox Theatre Company, and was involved in minor radio dramas and Shakespearean productions. While still a drama student, he first came to attention for his role in the premiere of Laura Wade's satirical play Posh in which he portrayed Guy Bellingfield, a student member of the "Riot Club", a parody of the Bullingdon Club at Oxford University.

McGuire made guest appearances on a number of BBC shows. He also starred as assistant to Stephen Fry's character in the comedy series The Bleak Old Shop of Stuff, a parody of Charles Dickens' works.

McGuire played Rory in Richard Curtis's film About Time. In May 2016, McGuire played the role of Nunney in the BBC drama Love, Nina.

== Acting credits ==
=== Film ===
Year	Title	Role	Notes
2013	About Time	Rory	
2014	Mr Turner	John Ruskin	
2014	Get Santa	Tony	
2015	Cinderella	Palace Official	
2017	Bees Make Honey	Mr. Conick	
2018	The Happy Prince	Ambrose Smithers	
2018	Old Boys	Huggins	
2020	Artemis Fowl	Briar Cudgeon	
2020	The Duke	Eric Crowther	
2021	All My Friends Hate Me	George	
2022	The House	Uncle Georgie	Voice
2022	Fisherman's Friends: One and All	Gareth	
2023	Saltburn	Henry	
2023	My Mother's Wedding	Jeremy	
2024	Blitz	Clive	

=== Television ===
Year	Title	Role	Notes
2010	EastEnders: E20	Olly Manthrope-Hall	2 episodes
2010	Doctors	James Neathercote	Episode: "Good Clean Fun"
2010	Misfits	Ollie	Episode #2.4
2011	The Bleak Old Shop of Stuff	Fearshiver	Episode: "Christmas Special"
2011–2012	The Hour	Isaac Wengrow	12 episodes
2012	A Young Doctor's Notebook	Even Younger Doctor	Episode: "Episode Four"
2013–2015	You, Me & Them	Tim Walker	8 episodes
2014, 2016	Siblings	Jack	2 episodes
2014–2018	Lovesick (Scrotal Recall)	Angus	17 episodes
2016	Love, Nina	Mark 'Nunney' Nunn	5 episodes
2018	Patriot	Alan Truffle	2 episodes
2019	Urban Myths	Jean-Paul Goude	Episode: "Grace Under Pressure"
2020	Industry	Michael Walker	2 episodes
2022	Cheaters	Josh	18 episodes
2022	Anatomy of a Scandal	Chris Clarke	6 episodes
2022	Ten Percent	Howard Kestler	Episode #1.3
2022	The Man Who Fell to Earth	Zach	2 episodes
2024	The Gentlemen	Peter Spencer-Forbes / Sticky Pete	2 episodes
2025	The Gold	Douglas Baxter	Series 2; 6 episodes
2026	Ponies	Phil	Episode: "Second Hand News"
TBA	The Gray House	Erasmus Ross	8 episodes

=== Theatre ===
Year	Title	Theatre	Role
2001	King John	Royal Shakespeare Company	Arthur
2010	Posh	Royal Court Theatre	Guy Bellingfield
2010	Hay Fever	Rose Theatre, Kingston	Simon Bliss
2011	Hamlet	Shakespeare's Globe	Hamlet
2012	Posh	Duke of York's Theatre	Guy Bellingfield
2012–2013	The Magistrate	National Theatre	Cis Farringdon
2014	Privacy	Donmar Warehouse	The Writer
2014	Amadeus	Chichester Festival Theatre	Mozart
2014	The Ruling Class	Trafalgar Studios	Dinsdale Gurney
2015	Future Conditional	The Old Vic	Oliver
2017	Rosencrantz and Guildenstern Are Dead	The Old Vic	Guildenstern
2018–2019	I'm Not Running	National Theatre	Sandy Mynott
2024	Rhinoceros	Almeida Theatre	Jean
