= Tamara Harvey =

Theatre director

- Born: Botswana
- Education: University of Bristol
- Occupation: Theatre director
- Years active: 2000–present

Tamara Harvey is a British-based theatre director and is co-artistic director of the Royal Shakespeare Company.

== Background ==
Tamara Harvey was born in Botswana, grew up in Massachusetts and Brighton, and studied at the University of Bristol.

== Career ==
Harvey was a directing intern at the Shakespeare Theatre of New Jersey. Her first professional job in theatre was as assistant director at Shakespeare’s Globe under Mark Rylance.

Harvey was artistic director of Theatr Clwyd in Wales from 2015 to 2023. She was previously an associate director at the Bush Theatre in London.

Harvey directed Laura Wade's play Home, I'm Darling starring Katherine Parkinson at Theatr Clwyd in July 2018. Harvey had directed a couple of Wade's early plays in 2000 and 2003 after meeting at university. The play transferred to the National Theatre for a summer 2018 run and to the Duke of York's Theatre in January 2019, and later won Best Comedy at the 2019 Laurence Olivier Awards.

On 21 September 2022, it was announced that Harvey with Daniel Evans with Tamara Harvey would become joint Artistic Director of the Royal Shakespeare Company succeeding Gregory Doran (as Emeritus Artistic Director) and Erica Whyman (Acting Artistic Director) from June 2023. Their first season was announced on 16 January 2024.

Harvey directed Alfred Enoch in Pericles in 2024 at the Swan Theatre and the Chicago Shakespeare Theater.

In 2025, Harvey reunited with writer Laura Wade for her adaptation of W. Somerset Maugham's The Constant Wife. It was staged at the RSC Stratford Swan Theatre starring Rose Leslie, then toured the UK in 2026 starring Kara Tointon, prior to a planned West End residency. It was produced by David Pugh, with set and costumes designed by Anna Fleischle and Cat Fuller, and a score by Jamie Cullum.
