= Airswimming =

Play written by Charlotte Jones

Airswimming is the first play written by Charlotte Jones. Its 1997 premiere at the Battersea Arts Centre was directed by Anna Mackmin (making her debut as a director) and featured Rosie Cavaliero and Scarlett Mackmin. It is based on two women being imprisoned in a mental asylum in the 1920s for having children outside of marriage, only being released in the 1970s.
