= The Watsons (play) =

2018 play by Laura Wade based on the unfinished novel by Jane Austen

- Original language: English
- Written by: Laura Wade (play); Jane Austen (unfinished novel)

Premiere
- Date: 3 November 2018
- Place: Minerva Theatre, Chichester

The Watsons is a play by Laura Wade adapted from the unfinished novel of the same name by Jane Austen.

== Production ==
The play made its premiere at the Minerva Theatre in Chichester from 3 November to 1 December 2018. Following the production's success, it transferred to the Menier Chocolate Factory in London, running from 20 September to 16 November, 2019, with favourable reviews.

In the course of the play, at the point where Jane Austen’s original story breaks off, the dramatist comes onstage (played by an actor in the part of a maid) and enters into a protracted debate with the rebellious characters about how it should continue. The Guardian's reviewer commented that "one of the play's many pleasures is its capacity to endlessly take us by surprise. We go in expecting a literary exercise and come out having seen a philosophical comedy". Kathryn Hughes noted in The Times Literary Supplement how the play acknowledges Luigi Pirandello's Six Characters in Search of an Author as its precursor and how the modern audience is challenged to question its own escapism in indulging in yet another Regency drama.

The script has since been published by Oberon Books. It was announced in addition that the play was due to transfer to the Harold Pinter Theatre in London's West End in May 2020. However, performances had to be cancelled due to the COVID-19 pandemic.
