= The Riot Club =

2014 film by Lone Scherfig

- Theatrical release poster
- Directed by: Lone Scherfig
- Written by: Laura Wade
- Based on: Posh by Laura Wade
- Produced by: Graham Broadbent; Peter Czernin
- Starring: Sam Claflin; Max Irons; Douglas Booth; Jessica Brown Findlay; Holliday Grainger; Tom Hollander; Freddie Fox; Ben Schnetzer
- Cinematography: Sebastian Blenkov
- Edited by: Jake Roberts
- Music by: Kasper Winding
- Production companies: Blueprint Pictures; Film4; HanWay Films; Pinewood Films
- Distributed by: Universal Pictures International
- Release dates: 6 September 2014 (TIFF); 19 September 2014 (United Kingdom)
- Running time: 107 minutes
- Country: United Kingdom
- Language: English
- Box office: $3.5 million

The Riot Club is a 2014 British thriller drama film directed by Lone Scherfig and written by Laura Wade, based on Wade's 2010 play Posh. The film stars Sam Claflin, Max Irons and Douglas Booth. It is set among the Riot Club, a fictional all-male, exclusive dining club at the University of Oxford. When the play Posh premiered, the Riot Club was often described as a thinly veiled version of the real-life Bullingdon Club, although according to Wade, it is entirely fictitious.

The film was released in cinemas in the United Kingdom on 19 September 2014 by Universal Pictures International. It received mixed reviews from critics and grossed $3.5 million at the box office.

== Plot ==
Alistair and Miles, both with aristocratic connections, start their first year at Oxford University. Miles is friendly and level-headed, cordially offering to switch rooms when Alistair's assigned room does not meet with his parents' approval, and beginning a relationship with Lauren, who has a working-class, Northern background. Alistair is an insecure, arrogant, and cold-hearted snob. The two are tutorial partners at Oxford, where Alistair is blatant in his contempt for Miles and his left-leaning politics.

The Riot Club, a long-established exclusive drinking club priding itself on hedonism and the belief that money can buy anything, is on the hunt for new members to maintain its roster of ten men, all of whom must be educated at private schools. Alistair is invited by Harry, whom he has met during the start of their term. Miles, who was out drinking in the pub, is invited by Hugo, another Riot Club member. Alistair finds a new friend in Harry, who introduces him to his Uncle Jeremy, a senior MP—which Alistair himself aspires to be one day. After an unpleasant initiation, Miles and Alistair become members of the Riot Club.

Having been barred from most establishments in Oxford, the club has its annual dinner at the function room in a country pub. Alistair and Miles are both surprised to see each other there, Alistair showing open disdain. The Club begins their dinner, and though the landlord is initially excited to have a wealthy, aristocratic party dining at his establishment, their raucous behaviour annoys the pub's other patrons, some of whom leave. Chris, the landlord, is put off by their behaviour and tells them that they are disrupting his business; the boys settle with an arrangement with them paying for his losses to let them continue to stay, which he reluctantly accepts. After the escort Harry hired refuses to perform group oral sex, Alistair takes Miles's phone and texts Lauren without Miles knowing. Lauren then shows up at the pub to the surprise of Miles, whom the boys promptly proposition to do what the escort would not. They insult her, and Lauren then attempts to leave the pub but is sexually assaulted by one of the members. Miles struggles to rescue her as the other members hold him back. Hugo intervenes and orders the boys to let her leave, which she does.

Miles, drunk and seemingly depressed after what happened to Lauren, stays quiet for the rest of the night, while Alistair works up the rest with his political ideals of the rich and the poor. Becoming progressively more drunk and ingesting drugs, they start to wreck the room. When Chris comes to confront them, Alistair insults Chris by giving him money which he does not accept, telling them they are no better than a bunch of kids breaking shop windows and that they are just spoiled brats. Alistair punches him followed by the others who viciously attack him until he falls unconscious. While the members become frantic realizing what they just have done, Miles calls for an ambulance.

The boys are all arrested but believing that the club is more important than the individual, they agree not to give statements. The club meets after the incident and agrees that Miles, as the newest club member, should take the blame for the attack on Chris. Miles tries to apologise to Lauren, who tells him to never talk to her again. Later, Chris's skin is then found underneath Alistair's fingernails, meaning they can arrest and charge him. Alistair is sent down (expelled) from Oxford, being the only one arrested for the incident, whilst the others are allowed to continue their studies without any criminal charges. After a talk with the dean, Miles is approached by the new president of the Riot Club, Guy Bellingfield, to re-join next year, but after nearly having to leave university because of the scandal, he decides to leave the club, a decision which the new president mocks.

Alistair is invited to a meeting with Jeremy in London, who asks for the Riot Club to be kept out of future court appearances, and assures Alistair that despite being kicked out of Oxford, the boy is still a Riot member. Though Alistair is initially aggressively dismissive of Jeremy's proposed assistance, Alistair is brought around when Jeremy offers the boy a position in his office and an assured future. The film concludes with Alistair leaving the meeting with Jeremy, a smug smile on his face as he walks down the street.

== Cast ==
- Sam Claflin as Alistair Ryle, a first-year history student whose brother, Sebastian, was considered a "legendary" member of the Riot Club. Alistair is politically right, leading to intense conflict and rivalry with Miles. Alistair attended Harrow School, unlike his brother, who attended Eton College.
- Max Irons as Miles 'Milo' Richards, a first-year history student who joins the Riot Club. Miles is the eldest of his siblings and possesses the courtesy title of 'the honourable' which implies that his father is a Viscount, Baron or Life Peer. Miles is politically left and becomes disillusioned and frustrated with the actions of his club mates. He attended Westminster School.
- Douglas Booth as Harry Villiers, an older, charismatic student whose family is quite wealthy, though they partially maintain this by allowing tourists to view their home, something which deeply rankles Harry. His uncle, Jeremy, was previously a member of the Riot Club. Educated at Eton.
- Jessica Brown Findlay as Rachel, daughter of Chris and a waitress at his pub
- Holliday Grainger as Lauren, a Northern first-year student from a working-class family who enters into a relationship with Miles at the start of the film
- Freddie Fox as James Leighton-Masters, the president of the club; he is criticised by the other members of the club for scaling back the club's activities in an effort to not jeopardize his future. Educated at St Pauls.
- Ben Schnetzer as Dimitri Mitropoulos, an older student of Greek heritage who seems to act as the club's primary bankroll. It is also suggested that Dimitri is nouveau riche. He appears to have a close friendship with Guy Bellingfield, though it is the very same member who constantly mocks Dimitri and his heritage. Educated at Eton, where he met and became friends with Bellingfield.
- Natalie Dormer as Charlie, an escort hired by Harry
- Gordon Brown as Chris, owner of the pub where the club has their dinner
- Sam Reid as Hugo Fraser-Tyrwhitt, an older student whose family, although established members of the gentry, is not financially well-off. He was at least a couple of years Miles' senior at Westminster and although they did not socialize, Miles remembers Hugo composing limericks in Latin, something which is implied got him bullied. Hugo is homosexual, and has a romantic interest in Miles.
- Matthew Beard as Guy Bellingfield, an older student who makes no secret of his desire to succeed James as president of the club. He is close friends with Dimitri, though he often makes jokes about his Greek heritage. He presents himself as very enthusiastic with little to no regard for any serious matters. Educated at Eton.
- Tom Hollander as Jeremy Villiers, Harry's uncle and a successful Conservative MP. In the play, he is Guy's godfather.
- Jack Farthing as George Balfour, a 'country gentleman' from an old landowning family. Similar to his counterpart Hugo, it is implied that his family might not be financially well-off. George displays enthusiastic interest and knowledge in farming, hunting, game, and llamas. Balfour seems more egalitarian than some of his fellow club mates, perhaps due to his Catholic background, and spends time with his family's tenant farmers, though Alistair manipulates Balfour's insecurity about his position with the farmers to convince him to take part. Unlike most of the other club members, Balfour is a Catholic and was educated at The Oratory.
- Olly Alexander as Toby Maitland, an older student who appears to have a very close friendship with Ed. Educated at Eton.
- Josh O'Connor as Ed Montgomery, an older student who appears to have a very close friendship with Toby. Educated at Eton.
- Samuel West as tutor
- Andrew Woodall as Alistair's father
- Anastasia Hille as Alistair's mother
- Julian Wadham as Miles's father
- Geraldine Somerville as Miles's mother
- Harry Lloyd as Lord Ryot, the extraordinarily dissolute student in whose memory the Riot Club was founded (events preceding and following his premature death are depicted in flashbacks at the start of the film)
- Joseph Kloska as ruby wedding man
- Miles Jupp as male banker
- Vera Chok as female banker
- Joey Batey as eager chap

== Production ==
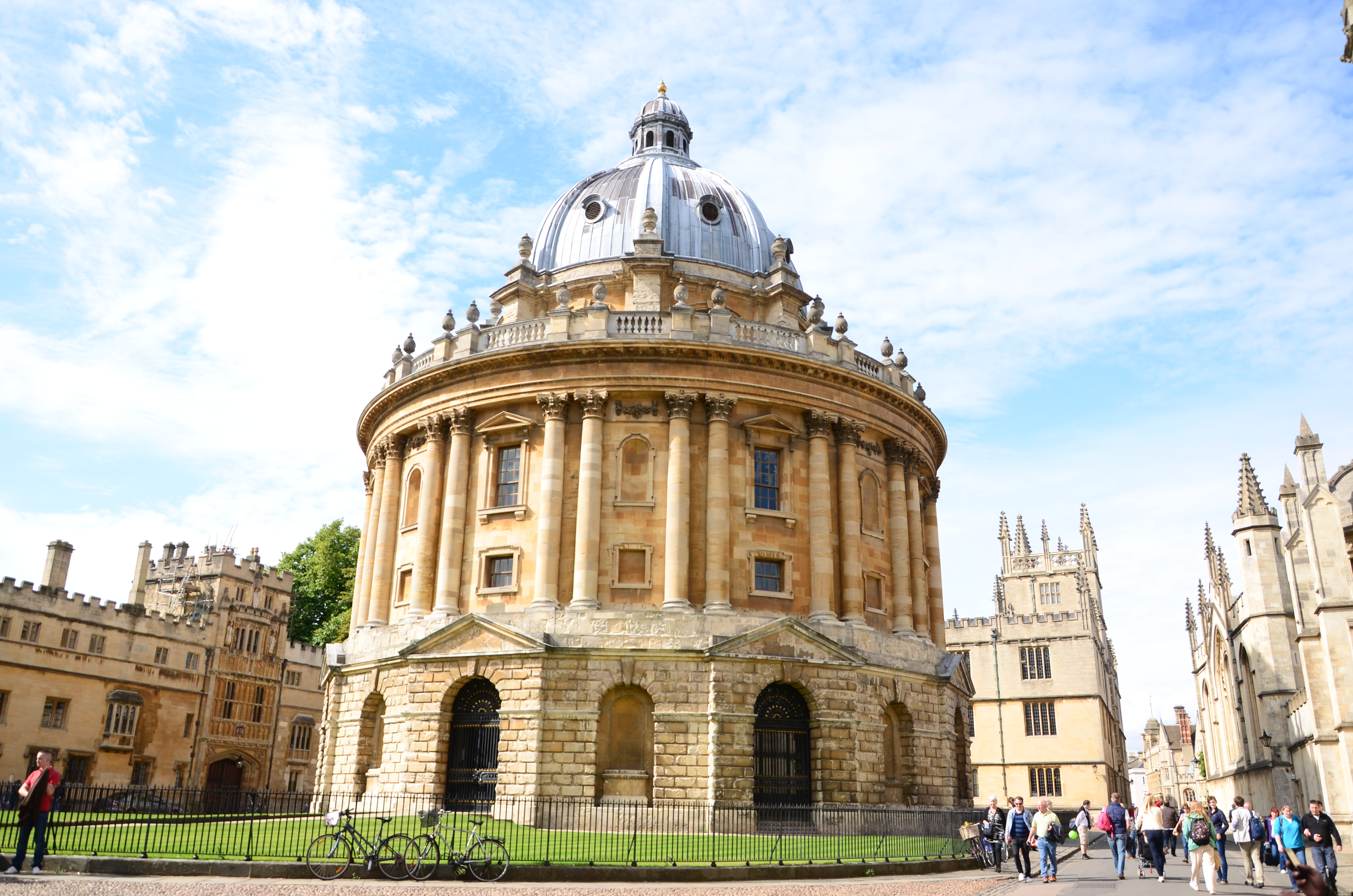
The film is set in locations in and around Oxford University (and at a village pub).

On 5 February 2013 it was reported that HanWay and Blueprint Pictures would produce the adaptation of the play Posh written by Laura Wade. The producers would be Graham Broadbent and Pete Czernin, with the BFI Film Fund and Film4 Productions. On 15 March 2013 Robert Pattinson, Sam Claflin, Max Irons and Douglas Booth were understood to be under consideration to play the lead. On 18 March Max Irons was confirmed as the lead. On 19 May 2013 Sam Claflin also joined the cast, as well as Douglas Booth. On 20 May 2013 Universal Pictures International acquired the UK and Irish rights to the film. On 11 July 2013, Natalie Dormer also joined the cast.

=== Filming ===
The shooting of the film began on 30 June 2013 in Oxford, England. The crew was spotted during the filming of scenes at Magpie Lane. Filming also took place at Pinewood Studios and Winchester College.

== Marketing ==
The first trailer for the film was released on 30 July 2014.

== Reception ==
On the review aggregator website Rotten Tomatoes, the film holds an approval rating of 66% based on 70 reviews, with an average rating of 5.4/10. The website's critics consensus reads, "The Riot Club may not be subtle, but it makes its points with power, using dark humor and a talented cast to offer a scathing indictment of unearned privilege." On Metacritic, the film has a score of 54 out of 100 based on reviews from 18 critics, indicating "mixed or average" reviews.
