= Sally Messham =

British actress (born c.1995)

Sally Messham (born c. 1995) is a British actress.

A native of Norton, County Durham, Messham was accepted into the Royal Academy of Dramatic Art in 2013, and graduated in 2015.

Messham's made her acting debut in 2015, appearing in the miniseries Midwinter of the Spirit, and taking the lead role in the stage adaptation of the novel Tipping the Velvet, Film roles include Allied (2016), Artemis Fowl (2020), and Aftersun (2022).

In 2022, Messham was cast to portray Bep Voskuijl in the miniseries A Small Light, as well in a role Steve McQueen's World War II drama Blitz (2024). In 2024, she joined the cast of Outlander: Blood of My Blood, a prequel series to Outlander.

== Filmography ==
=== Film ===
Year	Title	Role	Notes
2016	Denial	Meg	
2016	Allied	Margaret	
2019	Our Ladies	Manda	
2020	Artemis Fowl	Sky Willow	
2022	Aftersun	Belinda	
2024	Blitz	Agnes	

=== Television ===
Year	Title	Role	Notes
2017	Midwinter of the Spirit	Jane Watkins	Miniseries, 3 episodes
2017	The Miniaturist	Hanna	Miniseries, 3 episodes
2017-2019	Doc Martin	Emily Burnett	2 episodes
2022	Sherwood	Young Cathy	1 episode
2023	A Small Light	Bep Voskuijl	Miniseries, 8 episodes
2025	Outlander: Blood of My Blood	Mrs. Fitzgibbons	Recurring role, 7 episodes

== Stage ==
Year	Title	Role	Theatre
2015	Tipping the Velvet	Nancy Astley	Lyric Hammersmith
