= Plain Clothes Theatre Productions =

Company Logo

Plain Clothes Theatre Productions is a Bristol-based theatre company producing contemporary plays from around the globe. Formed in 2003 by artistic director Sam Berger , the company has produced work in London, Bristol, Cheltenham, Toronto and Vancouver. Their work has included plays by Joe Orton, Laura Wade and David Mamet, and their style is based around the teachings of American acting coach Sanford Meisner.

== Formation of the Company ==
The company was formed in 2003 by Sam Berger to coincide with his graduation from the MA Directing course from Goldsmiths College, London. The company initially consisted of three core members - as well as Sam Berger, Catherine Hoare designed set and costume and Dirk Mandlebrot produced sound effects and chose music for their shows.

Their first production was Joe Orton's 'Entertaining Mr. Sloane' which ran at the White Bear Theatre in Kennington, London.

== Plain Clothes Theatre in Canada ==
After their inaugural production Plain Clothes Theatre's work moved to Canada in conjunction with Sam Berger's move there. A number of co-productions took place, including development of a new musical, Plane Crazy, in Toronto with M. Rubinoff Productions and Closer by Patrick Marber with Paige 18 Productions in Vancouver. In 2005 they undertook a site-specific production of Duck Variations by David Mamet. The play was to be shown in Stanley Park. However, a week before the show went up the park authorities decided to stop the production. No reason has ever been clearly given.

== UK productions ==
=== Blue/Orange ===
Plain Clothes' are touring Joe Penhall's Blue/Orange around the South-West of England in Autumn 2008. Venues include the Tobacco Factory, Bristol; Cheltenham Everyman Studio, Swindon Arts Centre and the Rondo Theatre, Bath.

PRODUCTION STAFF
Director - Sam Berger
Designer - Danielle Bassett
Producer (Tour Management) - Rachel McNally
Producer (Publicity & Marketing) - Lucie Rennie
Stage Manager - Heather Readdy

CAST
Bruce - Christopher Tester
Christopher - Colin Dunkley
Robert - Chris Bianchi

=== Breathing Corpses ===
In 2007 the company produced Laura Wade's Breathing Corpses again at the Alma Tavern pub theatre. This play received excellent reviews and again sold out for the majority of its run. Venue magazine described the play as "brilliant...constantly unexpected, gripping, lifelike and not a cliché in site" and gave it a five-star review. The Bristol Evening Post commented "Plain Clothes are destined for bigger things. Future productions will have a hard act to follow." Following the success of the run, the play transferred to the Cheltenham Everyman Theatre in October.

At the end of the year Venue magazine awarded the play 'Best Theatre of 2007'.

PRODUCTION STAFF
Director - Sam Berger
Producer - Lucie Rennie
Set and Costume Design - Catherine Hoare
Lighting Design - James Kennard
Tour Assistant - Danielle Bassett
Lighting Ops (Cheltenham) - Adrian Henderson

CAST
Amy - Charlotte Ellis
Jim - David Angus
Elaine - Dee Sadler
Ray - Dave Rogers
Kate - Georgina Carey
Ben - Tom Turner
Charlie - Ashley Callum

=== Problem Child & Criminal Genius ===
In 2006 the company produced a double bill of plays by Canadian playwright George F. Walker from his 'Suburban Motel' collection of plays; namely Problem Child and Criminal Genius. The show ran at Bristol's Alma Tavern pub theatre over March and April gleaning good reviews and sell-out audiences.

PRODUCTION STAFF
Director - Sam Berger
Designer - Catherine Hoare
Stage Manager - Adrian Henderson
Sound Design - Dirk Mandlebrot

CAST
Problem Child
RJ - Tom Turner
Denise - Maria Hodson
Phillie - Toby W. Davies
Helen - Natasha Black

Criminal Genius
Rolly - Steven Boswell
Stevie - Henry Barrett
Phillie - Toby W. Davies
Shirley - Maria Hodson
Amanda - Natasha Black
