= Tipping the Velvet (play) =

Play based on the novel by Sarah Waters

- Written by: Laura Wade
- Setting: 1887, Victorian England

Premiere
- Date: 28 September 2015
- Place: Lyric Hammersmith

Tipping the Velvet is a play based on the 1998 novel of the same name by Sarah Waters, adapted for the stage by Laura Wade. It received its world premiere at the Lyric Hammersmith, in September 2015, before transferring to the Royal Lyceum Theatre, Edinburgh the following month with whom it is a co-production.

== Production history ==
Tipping the Velvet has been adapted for the stage by Laura Wade, based on the 1998 novel of the same name by Sarah Waters. The novel was previously adapted into a BBC television series in 2002. On 14 April 2015, it was announced the play would receive its world premiere the same year and would begin previews at the Lyric Hammersmith on 18 September 2015, with an official opening night on 28 September, booking for a limited period until 24 October. The adaption had been in production for around four years.

The play was directed by Lyndsey Turner, with choreography by Alistair David, design by Lizzie Clachan, lighting design by Jon Clark, music by Michael Bruce and sound by Nick Manning. Following its premiere production the play was transferred to the Royal Lyceum Theatre, Edinburgh, as part of the 50th anniversary season of the Royal Lyceum Theatre company, where it ran from 28 October to 14 November 2015. A typical performance ran two hours and 54 minutes, including one interval of 20 mins.

Speaking about her novel being adapted, Waters said she was "thrilled" and that she could "think of no better setting for the play than the lush Lyric interior or the beautiful Lyceum in Edinburgh, and no more exciting creative talents than those of writer Laura Wade and director Lyndsey Turner." In addition Sean Holmes the artistic director of the Lyric speaking about what he commissioned the piece said that “What’s so brilliant about the novel is it is such an upfront, unapologetic celebration of sexuality that just happens to be between two women. “Obviously it’s set at a time when that’s frowned upon but it’s also just really about the journey to love and sexual discovery and the massive, formative journey that applies to everyone, whatever your sexuality is, and yet you never see portrayed between gay women.”

== Principal roles and original cast ==
Character	Lyric Hammersmith performer
Nancy Astley	Sally Messham
Kitty Butler	Laura Rogers
Walter Bliss	Jared Ashe
Diana Lethaby	Kirsty Besterman
Chairman	David Cardy
Mother/Dendy/Mrs. Jex/Annie	Amanda Hadingue
Sweet Alice	Ru Hamilton
Florence Banner	Adelle Leonce
Ralph Banner	Andy Rush
Blake	Sarah Vezmar
