= Hangmen (play) =

Play written by Martin McDonagh

- Written by: Martin McDonagh
- Original language: English

Premiere
- Date premiered: 18 September 2015
- Place premiered: Royal Court Theatre, London

Hangmen is a play by Martin McDonagh. It received its world premiere at the Royal Court Theatre, London, in September 2015, before transferring to the West End's Wyndham's Theatre.

The play was directed by Matthew Dunster, designed by Anna Fleischle, and featured David Morrissey and Reece Shearsmith among others. It was universally acclaimed by theatre critics, and was nominated for numerous awards including the Olivier Awards, Critics' Circle Theatre Awards and the Evening Standard Theatre Awards. For its U.S. premiere in 2018 at Off-Broadway's Atlantic Theater Company, Hangmen won the New York Drama Critics' Circle Award for Best Foreign Play.

== Synopsis ==
After a 1963 prologue showing British executioner Harry Wade at work, hanging a man, Hennessy, who goes to his grave proclaiming his innocence and pronouncing a curse on Harry, Hangmen flashes forward to 1965 in a town in northern England. The action centres around Harry, who we discover is the second-best hangman in the land. Harry owns a pub that he also lives above with his wife, Alice, and his fifteen-year-old daughter, Shirley. Harry is contending with the abolition of hanging in Britain while the pub is filled with cronies and sycophants, as well as a journalist who is trying to interview Harry about the abolition. Despite continually protesting that he has nothing to say on the record, Harry eventually takes the journalist upstairs and gives him an extensive interview, complete with disparaging remarks about the number-one hangman in England, named Pierrepoint. A smiling but menacing stranger named Mooney comes to the pub and stirs up some trouble, causing consternation among Harry and his cronies. Mooney inquires if there are any rooms about to let, and Alice offers him a room upstairs. But when Alice tries to call his references, Mooney explodes. Mooney also creepily flirts with Harry's daughter, Shirley, who later appears to go missing.

Over the next day or so, Mooney toys with Harry and leads him and his wife to believe that Mooney has kidnapped their daughter, Shirley. We learn that Mooney is in cahoots with Syd, one of the men in the bar and Harry's assistant hangman whom Harry has always treated with contempt. Syd is conspiring with Mooney to take Harry down a peg, but it becomes clear that Mooney may have more on his mind than just scaring Harry. Mooney's taunting eventually pushes Harry and his cronies to put a noose around his neck and stand him on a chair to force him to reveal Shirley's whereabouts. Suddenly, Pierrepoint, the best hangman in England, storms into the bar to confront Harry about the disparaging remarks Harry made about Pierrepoint in the paper. This forces Harry and his crew to hide the now choking Mooney behind a curtain. When Pierrepoint eventually leaves, Harry and company discover Mooney has been hanged behind the curtain, which was apparently Mooney's goal all along. Shirley returns to the bar, completely unharmed. The play ends with Harry and his friends soberly reflecting on what they have done, while Harry is also forced to deal with the justification of the hanging he performed at the very beginning of the play.

== Production history ==
Original 2015 cast of Hangmen

Hangmen is written by playwright Martin McDonagh. The play is set primarily in Oldham during 1965 and centres around the abolition of the death penalty in the United Kingdom. On 15 July 2015, it was announced by artistic director Vicky Featherstone, that the play would receive its world premiere as part of the Royal Court Theatre's autumn 2015 season. It marked McDonagh's first London play since 2003, when The Pillowman debuted at the National Theatre. The play began previews on 10 September 2015, with an official opening night on 18 September, booking for a limited period until 10 October.

The play is directed by Matthew Dunster, with fight direction by Kate Waters, design by Anna Fleischle, lighting design by Joshua Carr and sound design by Ian Dickinson. Following its premiere production the play transferred to the West End's Wyndham's Theatre, where it began previews on 1 December 2015, with its official opening night on 7 December, booking until 5 March 2016. A typical performance ran two hours and thirty minutes, including one interval.

Hangmen was published by Faber and Faber on 17 September 2015 and received a National Theatre Live broadcast on 3 March 2016. An encore broadcast was shown at selected Vue Cinemas across the UK on 22 March 2016.

The Royal Court production transferred to Off-Broadway at the Atlantic Theater Company in New York from 18 January to 4 March 2018, with original cast members Reece Shearsmith, Sally Rogers and Johnny Flynn returning.

The play was scheduled to open on Broadway at the John Golden Theatre on 19 March 2020, but the run was cancelled because of the COVID-19 pandemic after thirteen previews. In February 2022, it was announced that the play was once again scheduled to premiere at the John Golden Theatre on 21 April that year, with previews beginning on 8 April. The production saw most of the 2020 cast return, with the exception of Dan Stevens as Mooney, Mark Addy as Harry and Ewen Bremner as Syd, replaced respectively by Alfie Allen, David Threlfall and Andy Nyman. The production closed on 18 June 2022.

== Principal roles and original cast ==
| Character | Royal Court | West End | Off-Broadway | Broadway | |
| Character | 2015 | | 2018 | 2020 | 2022 |
|---|---|---|---|---|---|
| Harry | David Morrissey | David Morrissey | Mark Addy | Mark Addy | David Threlfall |
| Mooney | Johnny Flynn | Johnny Flynn | Johnny Flynn | Dan Stevens | Alfie Allen |
| Syd | Reece Shearsmith | Andy Nyman | Reece Shearsmith | Ewan Bremner | Andy Nyman |
| Alice | Sally Rogers | Sally Rogers | Sally Rogers | Tracie Bennett | Tracie Bennett |
| Shirley | Bronwyn James | Bronwyn James | Gaby French | Gaby French | Gaby French |
| Clegg | James Dryden | James Dryden | Owen Campbell | Owen Campbell | Owen Campbell |
| Inspector Fry | Ralph Ineson | Craig Parkinson | David Lansbury | Jeremy Crutchley | Jeremy Crutchley |
| Bill | Graeme Hawley | Tony Hirst | Richard Hollis | Richard Hollis | Richard Hollis |
| Charlie | Ryan Pope | Ryan Pope | Billy Carter | Ryan Pope | Ryan Pope |
| Arthur | Simon Rouse | Simon Rouse | John Horton | John Horton | John Horton |
| Pierrepoint | John Hodgkinson | John Hodgkinson | Maxwell Caulfield | John Hodgkinson | John Hodgkinson |
| Hennessy | Josef Davies | Josef Davies | Gilles Geary | Josh Goulding | Josh Goulding |
| Guard | Mark Rose | Mark Rose | Maxwell Caulfield | Richard Hollis; Ryan Pope | Richard Hollis; Ryan Pope |

== Reception ==
=== Critical response and accolades ===
The play has received positive reviews from critics.

At the 2016 Laurence Olivier Awards, the show won for Best New Play and Set Design as well as being nominated in the Best Director category. It also won Best Play and Best Designer at the Critics' Circle Theatre Awards 2015 and Best Design at the Evening Standard Theatre Awards 2015.

=== Original London production ===
| Year | Award | Category | Nominee | Result | Ref. |
|---|---|---|---|---|---|
| 2015 | Critics' Circle Theatre Award | Best New Play | Martin McDonagh | Won | |
| 2015 | Critics' Circle Theatre Award | Best Designer | Anna Fleischle | Won | |
| 2015 | Evening Standard Theatre Award | Best Play | Martin McDonagh | Nominated | |
| 2015 | Evening Standard Theatre Award | Best Designer | Anna Fleischle | Won | |
| 2016 | Laurence Olivier Awards | Best New Play | | Won | |
| 2016 | Laurence Olivier Awards | Best Director | Matthew Dunster | Nominated | |
| 2016 | Laurence Olivier Awards | Best Set Design | Anna Fleischle | Won | |
| 2016 | South Bank Sky Arts Award | Theatre | | Won | |
| 2016 | WhatsOnStage Award | Best New Play | | Nominated | |
| 2016 | WhatsOnStage Award | Best Supporting Actor in a Play | Johnny Flynn | Nominated | |

=== Original Off-Broadway production ===
| Year | Award | Category | Nominee | Result | Ref. |
|---|---|---|---|---|---|
| 2018 | Outer Critics Circle Awards | Outstanding New Off-Broadway Play | | Nominated | |
| 2018 | Outer Critics Circle Awards | Outstanding Featured Actor in a Play | Johnny Flynn | Nominated | |
| 2018 | Drama Desk Awards | Outstanding Actor in a Play | Johnny Flynn | Nominated | |

=== Original Broadway production ===
| Year | Award | Category | Nominee | Result | Ref. |
|---|---|---|---|---|---|
| 2022 | New York Drama Critics' Circle Award | Best Foreign Play | Martin McDonagh | Won | |
| 2022 | Tony Awards | Best Play | | Nominated | |
| 2022 | Tony Awards | Best Performance by a Leading Actor in a Play | David Threlfall | Nominated | |
| 2022 | Tony Awards | Best Performance by a Featured Actor in a Play | Alfie Allen | Nominated | |
| 2022 | Tony Awards | Best Scenic Design of a Play | Anna Fleischle | Nominated | |
| 2022 | Tony Awards | Best Lighting Design of a Play | Joshua Carr | Nominated | |
| 2022 | Drama League Award | Outstanding Production of a Play | | Nominated | |
| 2022 | Drama League Award | Outstanding Direction of a Play | Matthew Dunster | Nominated | |
| 2022 | Theatre World Award | | Gaby French | Won | |
