= Mammals (play) =

Mammals is a play by Amelia Bullmore. It was first staged at the Bush Theatre, Shepherd's Bush, London, from 6 April to 7 May 2005. This production then toured the UK in Spring 2006. With a cast of six, including Niamh Cusack, Mark Bonnar and Nancy Carroll.

The playwright was awarded the Susan Smith Blackburn Prize for the work.

== Roles ==
Role	Premiere Cast, 8 April 2005 London, The Bush Theatre	British Tour, 20 January 2006 Oxford, The Oxford Playhouse
Jane	Niamh Cusack	Niamh Cusack
Kev	Daniel Ryan	Daniel Ryan
Jess	Jane Hazlegrove	Jane Hazlegrove
Betty	Helena Lymbery	Helena Lymbery
Phil	Mark Bonnar	Mark Bonnar
Lorna	Nancy Carroll	Anna Chancellor
Directed by	Anna Mackmin	Anna Mackmin
