= Joanna Laurens =

Jersey writer (born 1978)

Joanna Laurens (born 21 April 1978) is an English playwright.

== Education ==
She read music at the Guildhall School of Music and Drama before moving to Belfast to read English at Queen's University Belfast before completing an MA in creative writing at the University of East Anglia in 2003.

== Career ==
Laurens' first play, The Three Birds (2000), opened at the Gate Theatre, London. This was followed by Five Gold Rings (2003), at the Almeida Theatre, London, and Poor Beck (2004), at The Other Place in a production by the Royal Shakespeare Company.

== Awards ==
Awards include: Critics' Circle Theatre Awards for Most Promising Playwright (2000); Time Out award for Most Outstanding New Talent (2001); finalist & Special Commendation for the Susan Smith Blackburn Prize.

== Plays ==
- The Three Birds (2000)
- Five Gold Rings (2003)
- Poor Beck (2004)
