= Posh (play) =

Play written by Laura Wade

- Written by: Laura Wade
- Characters: 14
- Original language: English
- Genre: Drama

Premiere
- Date premiered: April 2010
- Place premiered: Royal Court Theatre, London
- Official website

Posh is a play by the British playwright Laura Wade. It was first staged at the Royal Court Theatre in April 2010. The play concerns an Oxford University dining club called "The Riot Club", a fictionalised version of the Bullingdon Club. The first production, premiering shortly before the 2010 United Kingdom general election, received favourable reviews.

== Plot ==
Ten members of "The Riot Club", an exclusive Oxford University dining club, have rented out a country pub's dining room for their termly dinner. Their president, James, who is about to leave university, is falling out of love with the club and promises the suspicious landlord Chris and his waitress daughter Rachel that he will keep things under control. While James avoids his presidential duties, others vie for his position. Inspired by his godfather Jeremy, a former Riot Club member and now a Conservative MP, Guy tries to impress the boys with a "ten bird roast'. Others are less restrained: one has hired Charlie, a prostitute. When Charlie arrives she refuses to get under the table and perform oral sex on the boys; they are surprised at her scruples.

As the members get more drunk and rowdy, their bullying of each other and of Chris and Rachel gets worse. They try to force Rachel to kiss them all; she runs out and they wreck the room. Chris bursts in, outraged, and the members assault him, knocking him out. Horrified, they panic and bar the door, despite the landlord being seriously hurt. Hugo calls an ambulance, much to everyone else's annoyance. Eventually they all agree to pin the blame on Alistair, who has consistently riled them throughout the night. They agree that, as they will all end up being successful, they will look after Alistair after university and make sure they 'see him right'. They open the door to the distraught Rachel and the ambulance approaches.

Weeks later Alistair meets with Jeremy, who has managed to weaken the charge against Alistair and effectively get him off the hook. Intrigued by Alistair's politics, Jeremy promises Alistair that he will be keeping a close eye on him in future and that he has high hopes for him.

== Cast ==
Character	Original Cast, 2010	West End Cast, 2012	Regional Premiere Cast, 2015	All-Female Cast, 2017	Vancouver Cast, 2017	UK Tour Cast, 2019
Director	Lyndsey Turner	Lyndsey Turner	Susannah Tresilian	Cressida Carré	Allyson Fournier	Lucy Hughes
Jeremy (an MP)	Simon Shepherd	Simon Shepherd	Laurence Kennedy	Sarah Thom	Michael Shewchuk	Simon Rhodes
Chris	Daniel Ryan	Steffan Rhodri	Neil Caple	Sarah Thom	Michael Shewchuk	Peter McNeil O'Connor
Rachel	Fiona Button	Jessica Ransom	Charlotte Brimble	Toni Peach	Mariela Shuley	Isobel Laidler
Charlie	Charlotte Lucas	Charlotte Lucas	Joanne Evans	Toni Peach	Caroline Doyle	Ellie Nunn
Alistair Ryle	Leo Bill	Leo Bill	Jordan Metcalfe	Serena Jennings	Riaan Smit	Tyger Drew-Honey
Toby Maitland	Jolyon Coy	Jolyon Coy	Tom Clegg	Molly Hanson	Cole Howard	Matthew Entwistle
Hugo Fraser-Tyrwhitt	David Dawson	Pip Carter	Tom Hanson	Lucy Aarden	Kevin Hatch	Ollie Appleby
Guy Bellingfield	Joshua McGuire	Joshua McGuire	Philip Labey	Amani Zardoe	Jake Sheardown	Adam Mirsky
George Balfour	Richard Goulding	Richard Goulding	Jamie Satterthwaite	Macy Nyman	Thomas Van Kalken	Joseph Tyler Todd
Harry Villiers	Harry Hadden-Paton	Max Bennett	Robbie Jarvis	Alice Brittain	Kelly McCabe	Jack Whittle
Ed Montgomery	Kit Harington	Harry Lister Smith	Kaffe Keating	Verity Kirk	Dylan Leonard	Taylor Mee
Dimitri Mitropoulos	Henry Lloyd-Hughes	Henry Lloyd-Hughes	Simon Haines	Cassie Bradley	David Z. Cohen	Jamie Littlewood
James Leighton-Masters	Tom Mison	Tom Mison	Tom Palmer	Gabby Wong	Tim Howe	Chris Born
Miles Richards	James Norton	Edward Killingback	Dario Coates	Jessica Siân	Tristan Smith	George Prentice

== Premiere ==
The Royal Court Theatre production opened during the 2010 United Kingdom general election campaign and garnered much attention for its timely portrayal of an Oxford University dining club which might be seen as a parody of the real life Bullingdon Club. A number of prominent Conservative politicians have been members of the Bullingdon, including David Cameron, George Osborne and Boris Johnson.

The production's scene changes were marked by the Riot Club's a cappella renditions of contemporary popular music such as "Wearing My Rolex" by Wiley; the music was arranged by James Fortune.

== West End production ==
In 2012 the Royal Court production of the show was revived in the West End at the Duke of York's Theatre with several cast changes. The script was updated, including references to the coalition government which had since come to power and a slight recharacterisation of James Leighton-Masters in line with contemporary events. The a cappella renditions of songs were also updated, this time including LMFAO's "Sexy and I Know It".

== Female-led productions ==
In March 2016, female-led theatre company Anonymous Is A Woman Theatre Company staged a rehearsed reading of the play, directed by Lucy Jane Atkinson, in which the genders were cast in reverse: women played the 12 male roles; men played the 2 female roles. The following week, at AIAWTC's Women in the West End festival at the Arts Theatre, a gender-reversed scene from the play was performed, complemented by a non-gender-reversed performance of the same scene.

The following year, an all-female production of the play was staged at Pleasance Islington, directed by Cressida Carré and starring Cassie Bradley. All 14 roles, male and female, were played by women. The play was performed as it was initially written by Wade, using the male names and the "he" pronoun. The playwright, Laura Wade, said: "It’s always interesting to see a new cast take on Posh, but it’ll be fascinating to see what light an all-female company can throw on the play’s world of power and privilege. I’m often asked what Posh would have been like if there were women in the Riot Club instead of men. Perhaps now I get to find out".

== Subsequent productions ==
In February 2015 the regional premiere was co-produced by Nottingham Playhouse and Salisbury Playhouse, directed by Susannah Tresilian.

== Film adaptation ==
The Riot Club, a film adaptation of the play, directed by Lone Scherfig, was released in 2014.

== Reception ==
Both London productions received generally favourable reviews; the ensemble was well praised with some reviewers comparing the young male cast to the original cast of The History Boys by Alan Bennett. Some reviews criticised what they saw as an unbelievable ending, but the play received four stars from nearly all the major publications and five from Time Out. Posh was nominated as Best New Play at both the Evening Standard Theatre Awards and Theatregoers' Choice Awards in 2011.

A new student edition of the play was published by Methuen Drama in February 2024. This contained a new interview with Laura Wade about the play, an 8,000 word introduction and notes by Henry Bell.
