= Midwinter of the Spirit =

- Cover of DVD
- Genre: Horror Drama
- Created by: Phil Rickman; Stephen Volk
- Directed by: Richard Clark
- Starring: Anna Maxwell Martin; David Threlfall; Sally Messham; David Sterne; Ben Bailey Smith
- Composer: Edmund Butt
- Country of origin: United Kingdom
- Original language: English
- No. of series: 1
- No. of episodes: 3

Production
- Executive producers: Kieran Roberts; Melanie Darlaston
- Producer: Phil Collinson
- Production location: Filmed in Herefordshire
- Editor: David Blackmore
- Running time: 51 minutes (including commercials)
- Production companies: ITV Studios and Motion Content Group

Original release
- Network: ITV
- Release: 23 September – 7 October 2015

Midwinter Of The Spirit is a British horror drama television series that was broadcast as three episodes from 23 September 2015 to 7 October 2015, and stars Anna Maxwell Martin, David Threlfall, and Sally Messham.

== Plot ==
The series is based on Phil Rickman's "Merrily Watkins" series of books, of which "Midwinter of the Spirit" is the second in the series.

This series follows country vicar Merrily Watkins, who is one of the few women priests working as an exorcist in the UK. She is being mentored in the art of exorcism by clergyman Huw Owen, despite warnings from Canon Dobbs. When a grisly murder takes place in her local area, the police come calling for her assistance.

== Cast ==
- Anna Maxwell Martin as Vicar Merrily Watkins
- David Threlfall as Huw Owen
- Sally Messham as Jane Watkins
- Nicholas Pinnock as Bishop Mick Hunter
- Kate Dickie as DCI Annie Howe
- Leila Mimmack as Rowenna Napier
- Siobhan Finneran as Angela Purefoy
- Ania Marson as Mrs. Joy
- Ben Bailey Smith as Lol Robinson
- Will Attenborough as James Lydon
- David Sterne as Canon Dobbs

== Production ==
=== Development ===
The show was filmed in Herefordshire. Cathedral interiors were however filmed in Chester.

David Threlfall consulted with an exorcist (who author Phil Rickman put him in contact with) for advice on his role.

== Episodes ==
=== Series 1 ===
No. overall	No. in series	Title	Directed by	Written by	U.K. airdate	Viewers (in millions)
1	1	"Episode 1"	Richard Clark	Phil Rickman and Stephen Volk	23 September 2015	3.01
Merrily Watkins, a widowed rural vicar with a teen-aged daughter Jane, is learning the art of exorcism from the experienced clergyman Huw Owen, despite the warnings that it is dangerous from reclusive, troubled Canon Dobbs. Merrily is called upon by the police to help investigate the crucifixion of Satanist Paul Sayer after which she agrees to absolve the dying Denzil Joy, a man reckoned to have an evil spirit and as he dies Merrily is convinced it has passed to her. Aware that Dobbs knew and feared Joy Merrily visits the canon's house and makes a shocking discovery. Meanwhile Jane is approached by café owner Angela Purefoy who claims to be in touch with her dead father.
2	2	"Episode 2"	Richard Clark	Phil Rickman and Stephen Volk	30 September 2015	Under 2.01
Merrily is not convinced that Canon Dobbs killed himself and links his death, the murder in the woods and a dead crow on a church altar to a possible Satanic rite. Following a ceremony of exorcism where she 'sees' Denzil Joy she learns that the canon was visited by a bearded stranger and was also obsessed with the life of medieval bishop Thomas Cantilupe. Social worker Lol Robinson, hearing of the dead crow, tells Merrily that his client Rowenna, Jane's loner friend, also found one on her door-step though Rowenna gives it no significance. Merrily argues with Jane over the company she keeps, including a strange youth, James Lydon, known as the Boy Bishop of Hereford and then goes to the church to pray, believing herself to be alone.
3	3	"Episode 3"	Richard Clark	Phil Rickman and Stephen Volk	7 October 2015	Under 2.13
Following a row with her mother Jane runs away and Lol unearths a secret about Rowenna which may make her party to the flight. Huw discovers that Thomas Cantilupe, in whom Canon Dobbs was so interested, was baptized in the church where the dead crow was found and was a medieval fighter against demons, charged with the protection of Hereford cathedral, even after his death. With his grave desecrated the cathedral is once again exposed to Satanists. When Lol tells her that Jane is entering the cathedral with two false friends for the boy bishop's crowning Merrily realizes that her daughter is in danger and rushes to save her as well as to rid herself of Joy's baleful influence.

== Reception ==
=== Critical reception ===
The Daily Telegraph says that it's a "surprisingly faithful adaptation" while being "exceptionally creepy without ever venturing beyond the bounds of the credible". The Guardian newspaper reviewed the show by saying it "is not a slow build", and that "it dives straight in", and it adds that "it’s still a lot of fun, just the thing to both cheer and chill as the nights close in."
