= Susan Brown (English actress) =

English actress (born 1946)

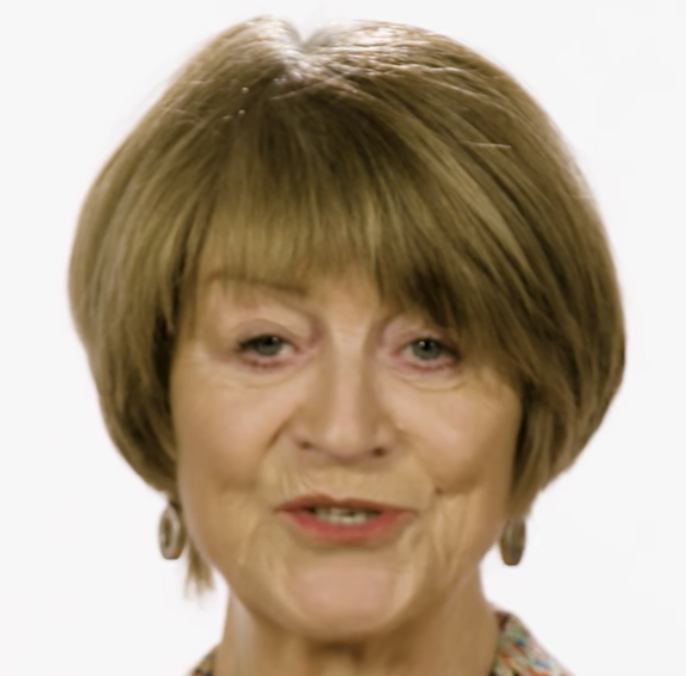
- Brown in 2018
- Born: Susan Elizabeth Brown; 6 May 1946 (age 80); Bristol, England
- Education: Rose Bruford College
- Occupation: Actress
- Years active: 1959–1960, 1971–present

Susan Elizabeth Brown (born 6 May 1946) is an English actress of stage and screen. She had roles in the film The Iron Lady (2011) and the first season of the television series Game of Thrones (2011).

Brown has been nominated for a Tony Award for her performance in the 2018 revival of the play Angels in America and a Laurence Olivier Award for her performance in the 2018 play Home, I'm Darling.

== Biography ==
Brown was born in Bristol, England. Before starting her professional career, Brown trained at Rose Bruford College. She has appeared in such stage productions as The Wild Duck (Donmar Warehouse), Henry IV Parts 1 & 2, Playing with Fire, Cardiff East and The Hour We Knew Nothing of Each Other (National Theatre), Easter, Romeo and Juliet, Richard III and Bad Weather (RSC), Road, Shirley, Downfall, Gibraltar Strait and Seagulls (Royal Court), Butterfly Kiss (Almeida), The House of Bernarda Alba and The Chairs (Gate Theatre), You Be Ted and I'll Be Sylvia (Hampstead), Playing Sinatra (Croydon Warehouse and Greenwich Theatre), The Beaux' Stratagem, Back to Methuselah, The Vortex, The Way of the World and A Woman of No Importance (Cambridge Theatre Company), Twelfth Night (English Touring Theatre), Small Change, Iphigenia (Sheffield Crucible) and Angels in America.

Brown played "Mrs Dimmock" a widow who comes across an oriental cannon, in an episode of Lovejoy, "The Peking Gun", in October 1993. To international audiences, Brown is perhaps best known for her role as Septa Mordane in the first series of Game of Thrones. Her character was killed off in the concluding episodes of the series. She had a supporting role as Margaret Thatcher's live-in carer June in The Iron Lady and has had small roles in BBC drama series Call the Midwife and Torchwood.

== Filmography ==
=== Film ===
Year	Title	Role	Notes
1960	The Road to Carey Street	Rosemary	TV film
1987	Hope and Glory	Mrs. Evans	
1989	Work Experience	Mrs. Percival	Short film
1998	Anorak of Fire	Mrs. Gascoigne	TV film
2002	A Matter of Taste	(unknown)	Short film
2003	The Brides in the Bath	Mrs. Crossley	TV film
2004	When Hitler Invaded Britain	Clara Milburn	TV film
2006	Pinochet in Suburbia	Female Lawyer	TV film
2008	Brideshead Revisited	Nurse	
2011	The Iron Lady	June, Housekeeper	
2012	Now Is Good	Shirley	
2013	Belle	Baroness Vernon	
2017	National Theatre Live: Angels in America: Perestroika	Hannah Pitt	
2017	National Theatre Live: Angels in America: Millennium Approaches	Hannah Pitt	
2021	National Theatre Live: Under Milk Wood	Various roles	
2024	Mary	Anna the Prophetess	
TBA	Rose Drake	Suzanne	Post-production

=== Television ===
Year	Title	Role	Notes
1959	Private Investigator	Mary	Episode: "A Shield for Caroline"
1959	Ask for King Billy	Girl	Episode: "Part 5"
1960	ITV Play of the Week	Theresa	Episode: "All Summer Long"
1971	Public Eye	Girl in Garage	Episode: "And When You've Paid the Bill, You're None the Wiser"
1972	Man at the Top	Mrs. Naughton	Episode: "High Stakes"
1972	Armchair Theatre	Naafi Girl	Episode: "The Breaking of Colonel Keyser"
1972	New Scotland Yard	Jean Gorton	Episode: "Papa Charlie"
1973	Then and Now	Annie	Episode: "In Memoriam"
1973–1974	The Kids from 47A	Miss Hayes	Recurring role; 9 episodes
1974	Within These Walls	Joan Harrison	Episode: "One Step Forward, Two Steps Back"
1975	The Hanged Man	Anna Kreidner	Mini-series; episode: "The Bridge Maker"
1976	The Duchess of Duke Street	Ivy	2 episodes: "A Present Sovereign" & "Honour and Obey"
1977	Rooms	Pat Spooner	3 episodes: "The Artist", "Repairs" & "Portraits"
1979	The Other Side	Joyce	Episode: "Underdog"
1981	Fanny by Gaslight	Mrs. Hopwood	Mini-series; 4 episodes
1985	Up the Elephant and Round the Castle	Mrs. Fowler	Episode: "The Pied Piper of Hamlet"
1985	Coronation Street	Connie Clayton	Series regular; 35 episodes
1986	Kit Curran	Wendy Lowe	Episode: "Blind Date"
1986	Slinger's Day	Gladys Slinger	Episode: "Going Bananas"
1987	ScreenPlay	Helen	Episode: "Road"
1988	Andy Capp	Ruby	Series regular; 6 episodes
1988	This Is David Lander	Joan Trescot	Episode: "The Rocketing Cast of Defence"
1989	ScreenPlay	Tracy	Episode: "Loving Hazel"
1990	Chain	Mrs. Elliott	Mini-series; episode: "Vicky Elliott"
1990	Kappatoo	Mrs. Cotton	3 episodes: "Tracey Times Two", "Time-Fuse" & "Out of Time"
1990	Alive from Off Center	Helen	Episode: "Road"
1990	The Paradise Club	Audrey	Episode: "Old Pals"
1990–1991	Making Out	Avril	Series regular; 8 episodes
1991	The Bill	Margaret Randle	Episode: "Too Many Chiefs"
1991	Prime Suspect	Linda	Mini-series; episode: "Price to Pay: Part 2". Uncredited role
1991	The Sharp End	Mrs. Swales	Mini-series; episode 7
1991	Screen One	Mrs. Tribbly	Episode: "Prince"
1991	Performance	Bill / Maria	Episode: "Absolute Hell" / Episode: "Nona"
1992	The Ruth Rendell Mysteries	Brenda Harrison	Episode: "Kissing the Gunner's Daughter: Part One"
1992	The Bill	Mary Cox	Episode: "A Friend in Need"
1992	Casualty	Julie	Episode: "Will You Still Love Me?"
1993	Stay Lucky	Barbara	2 episodes: "The Long Road... There" & "The Long Road... Back"
1993	Lovejoy	Mrs. Dimmock	Episode: "The Peking Gun"
1993	The Bill	Janie Pickett	Episode: "Outbreak"
1993	EastEnders	Jackie	4 episodes
1993–1995	September Song	Cilla	Series regular; 11 episodes
1994	Ben Elton: The Man from Auntie	Glenda Toughbitch / Operator	Episode: #2.4 / Episode: #2.5
1994	A Pinch of Snuff	Betsy Heppelwhite	Mini-series; 2 episodes
1994	The Riff Raff Element	Maggie Belcher	Series regular; 6 episodes
1995	A Touch of Frost	Stella Boxley	Episode: "No Refuge"
1995	Casualty	Joan Hawley	Episode: "Heartbreak Hotel"
1997	Wokenwell	Jacqui Clovis	Episode #1.5
1997	The Bill	Cheryl Walker	Episode: "Heartbreak Hotel"
1997	Knight School	Marjorie Scrope	Episode: "Opening Knight"
1998	Taggart	Jan Dickson	Episode: "Out of Bounds"
1999	Where the Heart Is	June Wrekin	Episode: "Moving On"
1999	The Bill	Jan Beckett	Episode: "Cracked Up"
1999	Dangerfield	Mrs. Bassett	Episode: "Forbidden Fruit"
2000	Randall & Hopkirk (Deceased)	Deirdre Hope	Episode: "A Blast from the Past"
2000	Peak Practice	Clare Bain	Episode: "Walls of Jericho"
2001	The Vice	Brothel Madam	Episode: "Out of Mind"
2001	Best of Both Worlds	Annie Sullivan	3 episodes
2001	Holby City	Avril Welbeck	Episode: "Family Ties"
2002	Wire in the Blood	Jean Lawson	2 episodes: "Justice Painted Blind: Parts 1 & 2"
2003	Blue Dove	Sylvie Brennan	Mini-series
2004	Dalziel and Pascoe	ACC Alex Lawrence	Episode: "The Price of Fame"
2004	La Femme Musketeer	Cecile D'Artagnan	Mini-series
2004	Rose and Maloney	Wendy Sillery	Series 2 regular; 6 episodes
2006	Coronation Street	Maureen Tully	2 episodes
2007	Holby City	Nora Simpson	Episode: "Paranoid Android"
2009	Torchwood	Bridget Spears	5 episodes: "Torchwood: Children of Earth - Days One to Five"
2010	Doctors	Brenda Napier	Episode: "Ghosts"
2010	Holby City	Rachel Jacoby	Episode: "Together Alone"
2011	Waking the Dead	Sue Myers	2 episodes: "Harbinger: Parts 1 & 2"
2011	Game of Thrones	Septa Mordane	6 episodes
2011	Midsomer Murders	Leticia Clifford	Episode: "The Sleeper Under the Hill"
2012	Stella	Senior Magistrate	Episode #1.9
2012	Silent Witness	Judge Royston	Episode: "Paradise Lost: Part 1"
2013	Call the Midwife	Mrs. Peacock	Episode #2.4
2013	Broadchurch	Liz Roper	Series regular; 7 episodes
2014	Father Brown	Ethel Fernsley	Episode: "The Shadow of the Scaffold"
2014	Casualty	Pauline Heggarty	Episode: "Who Cares?"
2014	Atlantis	Pemphredo	Episode: "The Grey Sisters"
2015	Partners in Crime	Mrs. Harrison	Mini-series; episode: "N or M?: Part 1"
2017	Holby City	Mrs. Birdie Thompson	2 episodes: "I Do, I Do, I Do" & "Gold Star"
2019	Good Omens	Mother Superior	Episode: "In the Beginning"
2021	It's a Sin	Mrs. Bowen	Mini-series; 2 episodes
2022	The Crown	Lady Dugdale	Episode: "Gunpowder"
2024	Mr Bates vs The Post Office	Min Howard	Mini-series; 4 episodes
2026	Bridgerton	Mrs. Crabtree	2 episodes: "The Field Next to the Other Road" & "Dance in the Country"
2026	Falling	Fiona	Mini-series

=== Video games ===
Year	Title	Role (voice)	Notes
2012	The Secret World	Dame Julia Beatrix Tyburn / Cucuvea / Olga Dimir / Additional voices	
2014	Dreamfall Chapters	Queenie / The Mole / Lady Alvane	
2014	LittleBigPlanet 3	Nana Pud	
2015	Everybody's Gone to the Rapture	Wendy Boyles	
2018	Thronebreaker: The Witcher Tales	Isbel of Hagge	
2021	It Takes Two	Stargazer / Additional voices	

=== Audio ===
Year	Title	Role	Notes
2007	Doctor Who: 100	Midwife / Mary	Parts 1 & 3
2008	Doctor Who: Return of the Krotons	Eleanor Harvey	
2009	Doctor Who: Castle of Fear	Maud the Withered / Yokel	
2009	Doctor Who: The Eternal Summer	Alice Withers	
2010	Doctor Who: The Song of Magaptera	Chief Engineer / Chanel	
2010	Doctor Who: The Prison in Space	Chairman Babs	
2010	Doctor Who: The Resurrection of Mars	Margaret	
2010	Doctor Who: Plague of the Daleks	Mrs. Withers / Mrs. Sowerby / Computer Voice	
2011	Graceless	Joy	Series 2
2015	Doctor Who: Death Match	Kastrella	

== Theatre credits ==
Year	Play	Role	Venue	Notes
1986	Road	Brenda / Molly / Helen / Marion	Royal Court Theatre, London	
1987	Downfall	Hettie	Royal Court Theatre, London	
1989	The Way of the World	Millament	Young Vic, The Cut, London	with Cambridge Theatre Company
1990	Gibraltar Strait	Mrs. Farrell / Carmen Proetta	Royal Court Theatre, London	
1992	Playing Sinatra	Sandra	Greenwich Theatre, London	
1992	The House of Bernarda Alba	La Poncia	Gate Theatre, London	
1994	Butterfly Kiss	Jenny Ross	Almeida Theatre, London	
1995	Easter	Mrs. Heyst	The Pit, London	with Royal Shakespeare Company
1996	Romeo and Juliet	Nurse	Barbican Theatre, London	with Royal Shakespeare Company
1996	Richard III	Queen Elizabeth	Barbican Theatre, London	with Royal Shakespeare Company
1997	Cardiff East	Marge	Royal National Theatre, South Bank, London	
1998	Bad Weather	Kay Tonnerre	The Other Place, Stratford-upon-Avon	with Royal Shakespeare Company
1999	You'll Be Ted and I'll Be Sylvia	Stella	Hampstead Theatre, South Hampstead, London	
2002	Small Change	Mrs. Harte	Crucible Theatre, Sheffield	
2003	We Happy Few	Hettie Oaks	Malvern Theatres, Malvern	
2003	Iphigenia	Clytemnestra	Crucible Theatre, Sheffield	
2004	Twelfth Night	Maria	UK Tour	with English Touring Theatre
2005	The Wild Duck	Mrs. Sorbie	Donmar Warehouse, Covent Garden, London	
2005	Playing with Fire	The Mayor	Royal National Theatre, South Bank, London	
2005	Henry IV, Part 1 & Part 2	Mistress Quickly	Royal National Theatre, South Bank, London	
2008	The Hour We Knew Nothing of Each Other	Ensemble	Royal National Theatre, South Bank, London	
2008	Harper Regan	Alison Wooley	Royal National Theatre, South Bank, London	
2009	The Contingency Plan	Tessa	Bush Theatre, Shepherd's Bush, London	
2011	Saved	Mary	Lyric Theatre, Hammersmith, London	
2012	Goodbye to All That	Iris	Royal Court Theatre, London	part of "Royal Court Young Writers' Festival"
2012	Making Noise Quietly	May Applewood	Donmar Warehouse, Covent Garden, London	
2013	If You Don't Let Us Dream, We Won't Let You Sleep	Joan	Royal Court Theatre, London	
2013	Julius Caesar	Casca	St. Ann's Warehouse, Brooklyn, New York City	
2014	Good People	Dotty	Noël Coward Theatre, London	
2015	Image of an Unknown Young Woman	Candace	Gate Theatre, London	
2015	Husbands & Sons	Mrs. Gascoigne	Royal National Theatre, South Bank, London	
2017	Angels in America	Hannah Pitt	Royal National Theatre, South Bank, London & Neil Simon Theatre, Midtown Manhattan, New York City	
2019	Home, I'm Darling	Sylvia	Duke of York's Theatre, London	also UK tour
2021	Under Milk Wood	Various roles	Royal National Theatre, South Bank, London	

== Awards and nominations ==
Year	Award	Category	Work	Result	Ref.
2018	Tony Awards	Best Featured Actress in a Play	Angels in America	Nominated	
2019	Laurence Olivier Awards	Best Actress in a Supporting Role	Home, I'm Darling	Nominated	
