= Playbox Theatre Company =

Theatre company for children and young people

Playbox Theatre Company is a theatre company for children and young people based in Warwick, England. Playbox provide training for children and young people aged 3–25 in various different areas, including theatre training, musical theatre, circus, voice and Shakespeare. Based at their purpose built theatre in Warwick, The Dream Factory, Playbox also run training sessions at various outlying centres including Leamington, Stratford-upon-Avon, Kenilworth, Solihull and Banbury. As well as providing training, Playbox also put on a number of productions throughout the year at The Dream Factory, in addition to international tours.

== History ==
The company was founded in 1986 by Mary King, the current Executive Director of Playbox Theatre. The company began life in a hotel room in 1986. That year they invited English theatre director Michael Bogdanov to be their patron and he accepted. By 1988 the company were performing in two theatres in Warwick and Kenilworth and a year later they added Balsall Common to their schedule. In 1989 Stewart McGill, husband of Mary King, joined Playbox as a director. In 1991 and 1992, Stratford upon Avon, Rugby, and Leamington Spa added to the list. In 1993 the company produced its first work for national television. In 1994 Playbox reached out further to Coventry and have since moved into buildings in Bristol and York. Today, Playbox Theatre are running sessions in Warwick, Leamington, Stratford-upon-Avon, Kenilworth, Solihull and Banbury.

In 1999, Playbox's own theatre, The Dream Factory, opened in Warwick following a £2.7 million grant from the Heritage Lottery Fund. The theatre has a varying capacity as it is essentially a black box theatre but for safety the maximum is 250. There are 184 seats in the main auditorium, although these are flexible and can be altered for performances on a thrust stage, or in the round.

== On tour ==
The company has performed throughout the country and further afield. In 1989 they played at the regionally well known Warwick Arts Centre and the world famous Edinburgh Festival. After Kraków City Council invited them to their city the company visited them. A year later a tour of the United States was staged. Further tours have been taken to these locations, as well as one to Germany, in the years since. Playbox has also taken Treasure Island to Cannizaro Park festival, playing on the same stage as Amy Winehouse. Playbox also added Tokyo to their resume in 2007. They visit Santa Monica every two years, in 2008 taking a tour of 'Monkey'. In the summer of 2010, Playbox will return to the Edinburgh Festival Fringe, where a group of 14 young actors will perform The Fallen, a new work exploring the effect of war on those left behind.

== Patrons ==
- David Almond
- Michael Bogdanov
- Sir Ben Kingsley
- Adrian Noble
- Harriet Walter
- Sophie Turner

== Notable shows ==
His Dark Materials - Playbox were the first company, after the National, to stage Pullman's epic. It starred Olivia Meguer, Calum Finlay, Ed Miller and Tabby Lamb. They also performed the first proper performance of the Massacre at Paris by Christopher Marlowe. It starred Conor Davis, Gracie Tomlin, Lucy Quirk and Hayden James Mulcock

== Notable alumni and members ==
Alumni include:

- Edmund Kingsley (son of Sir Ben Kingsley)
- Alice Lowe
- Jon Robyns
- Laura Wade
- Lil Woods
- Leo Bill
- Sophie Turner
- Joshua McGuire
- Tabby Lamb (Trans playwright and activist)
