= Blue/Orange =

Play written by English dramatist, Joe Penhall

- Written by: Joe Penhall
- Original language: English
- Genre: Comedy
- Setting: London psychiatric hospital

Premiere
- Date premiered: April 2000
- Place premiered: Cottesloe Theatre; London

Blue/Orange is a play written by English dramatist Joe Penhall. The play is a sardonically comic piece which touches on race, mental illness and 21st-century British life.

== Productions ==
The play premiered in the Cottesloe Theatre at the Royal National Theatre, London, beginning previews from 7 April 2000 with an opening night on 13 April, where it ran in repertory until 23 August, starring Bill Nighy as Robert, Andrew Lincoln as Bruce and Chiwetel Ejiofor as Christoper. The production was directed by Roger Michell, designed by William Dudley, with lighting by Rick Fisher and sound by Neil Alexander.

The production transferred to the Duchess Theatre (re-configuring the stalls for an in-the-round setting) in London's West End beginning previews on 24 April 2001, with an opening night on 30 April with Nighy, Lincoln and Ejiofor reprising their roles until 18 August. From 20 August, the second cast featured Shaun Parkes as Christopher, Neil Stuke as Bruce and David Threlfall as Robert until the production closed on 15 December 2001.

In 2007, an audio production of the play was released starring Daniel Davis, Teagle F. Bougere and Matt Letscher.

In 2008, Plain Clothes Theatre Productions toured the show around the South-West. Venues included the Tobacco Factory, Bristol; and Cheltenham Everyman and the Rondo Theatre, Bath.

In 2012 it ran at the Theatre Royal, Brighton, starring Robert Bathurst, Gerard McCarthy and Oliver Wilson.

A 2016 revival ran at the Young Vic directed by Matthew Xia starred David Haig as Robert, Daniel Kaluuya as Christopher and Luke Norris as Bruce.

A 2019 production ran at the Birmingham Repertory Theatre directed by Daniel Bailey starred Thomas Coombes as Bruce, Richard Lintern as Robert and Ivan Oyik as Christopher.

A 2021 production will tour Theatre Royal, Bath, Oxford Playhouse and Royal & Derngate, Northampton directed by James Dacre and starring Giles Terera as Robert, Michael Balogun as Christopher and Ralph Davis as Bruce.

== Synopsis ==
Blurb of the published edition:

In a London psychiatric hospital, an enigmatic patient claims to be the son of an African dictator - a story that becomes unnervingly plausible. BLUE/ORANGE is an incendiary tale of race, madness and a Darwinian power struggle at the heart of a dying National Health Service.

== Film adaption ==
In 2005, the play was adapted into a BBC television film directed by Howard Davies starring Brian Cox, John Simm and Shaun Parkes.

== Awards and nominations ==
Year	Award	Category	Nominee	Result
2000	Evening Standard Theatre Award	Best Play	Joe Penhall	Won
2000	Evening Standard Theatre Award	Outstanding Newcomer	Chiwetel Ejiofor	Won
2000	Critics' Circle Theatre Award	Best New Play	Joe Penhall	Won
2000	Critics' Circle Theatre Award	Most Promising Newcomer	Chiwetel Ejiofor	Won
2001	Laurence Olivier Award	Best New Play		Won
2001	Laurence Olivier Award	Best Actor	Bill Nighy	Nominated
2001	Laurence Olivier Award	Best Actor in a Supporting Role	Chiwetel Ejiofor	Nominated
