= Breathing Corpses =

2005 play by Laura Wade

Breathing Corpses is a 2005 play by the British playwright Laura Wade which first premiered at the Royal Court Theatre.

== Plot ==
The play traces backwards, starting from the discovery of a corpse of a man named Jim in a hotel room by the seemingly cursed and talkative hotel maid Amy. Each successive scene explains the previous scene: it follows the story of Jim, and the corpse of a young woman whom Jim found himself in his storage warehouse, which drove him to suicide in the first place.

== Premiere ==
The play premiered in 2005 at the Royal Court Theatre in London where it was very well received.

| Character | Original Cast, 2005 |
|---|---|
| Director | Anna Mackmin |
| Amy | Laura Elphinstone |
| Jim | Paul Copley |
| Elaine | Niamh Cusack |
| Ray | Ryan Pope |
| Kate | Tamzin Outhwaite |
| Ben | James McAvoy |
| Charlie | Rupert Evans |

For the play Laura Wade won the Critics' Circle Theatre Award for Most Promising Playwright 2005 and the Pearson Playwrights Best Play Award and George Devine Award. The production was also nominated for an Olivier Award for Outstanding Achievement in an Affiliate Theatre.

== Performance history ==
After its initial premiere it has since been produced in Sydney 2006, The Hague 2007 and most recently Melbourne 2016. The British regional premiere was at Alma Tavern Theatre, Bristol 2007 presented by Plain Clothes Theatre Productions. It subsequently toured to the Cheltenham Everyman Studio. The production won Venue magazine's Best Play of 2007. The American premiere, produced by Luna Theater Company, at Walnut Street Theatre, Philadelphia, Oct 2007 with the Chicago premiere being produced by Steep Theatre Jan 2008, directed by Robin Witt.
