= Jack Tinker =

English theatre critic (1938–1996)

Jack Tinker (15 February 1938 – 28 October 1996) was an English theatre critic.

Tinker made his reputation on the Brighton Evening Argus, before becoming theatre critic for the Daily Mail in 1972 where he worked for twenty-four years. He became the president of the Critics' Circle and the "most influential and most popular" of the London theatre critics until his death of a heart attack, aged fifty-eight. Lights in the West End were dimmed in his honour – a gesture usually reserved for deceased actors.

His obituary in The Independent reported that "Jack Tinker saw himself as in and of the theatre, a critic from inside the boundary who could be as savage as any of the outsiders but who always knew precisely what he was being savage about." His appearance was distinctive, too: "Flamboyant in manner and dress and often sporting a ponytail, Jack was an easily recognisable theatrical character. His wealth of anecdotes and engaging charm not only found him as at home at a restaurant table of actors and producers in a West End restaurant but also doing a regular turn entertaining passengers on the QE2 when he took a break from reviewing."

Among Tinker's notable reviews was his response to Sarah Kane's Blasted, in which he reported being "disgusted [...] by a play which appears to know no bounds of decency yet has no message to convey by way of excuse" and which he found "utterly without artistic merit".
