= Laura Wade =

English playwright (born 1977)

- Born: 16 October 1977 (age 48); Bedford, Bedfordshire, England
- Education: Bristol University (BA)
- Occupations: Playwright; screenwriter
- Partner: Samuel West
- Children: 2
- Writing career
- Years active: 1996–present

Laura Wade is an English playwright and screenwriter. She is known for her 2018 play Home, I'm Darling.

== Early life and education ==
Laura Wade was born in Bedford, Bedfordshire. She grew up in Sheffield, South Yorkshire, where her father worked for a computer company.

After completing her secondary education at Lady Manners School in Bakewell, Derbyshire, she studied drama at Bristol University and was later a member of the Royal Court Theatre Young Writers' Programme.

== Career ==
Laura Wade's first play, Limbo, was produced at the Sheffield Crucible Studio Theatre in 1996. 16 Winters was produced at the Bristol Old Vic Basement Theatre in 2000. After university she worked for the children's theatre company Playbox Theatre in Warwick. Wade's adaptation of W. H. Davies' Young Emma opened at the Finborough Theatre, London (where she was later Writer-in-Residence) in December 2003. Both Young Emma and 16 Winters were directed by Tamara Harvey, a contemporary from Bristol. In 2004, Wade was a writer on attachment at Soho Theatre and her play Colder Than Here was produced there in February 2005. Her next play Breathing Corpses played at the Royal Court Theatre Upstairs in March 2005. In March 2006, she returned to the Soho Theatre with Other Hands. 2010 marked her reappearance at the Sheffield Crucible with her reworking of Alice in Wonderland, entitled Alice.

Wade's first radio play, Otherkin, was broadcast on BBC Radio 4 on 30 August 2007, a 45-minute play billed as episode 2 of the Looking for Angels series. Her second, Hum, about the Bristol Hum, was broadcast on BBC Radio 3 on 20 May 2009. Between these two she also wrote Coughs and Sneezes for the Radio 4 series Fact to Fiction. In April 2010, her play Posh began a sell-out run at the Jerwood Theatre Downstairs at the Royal Court Theatre, London. An article about Wade in the London Evening Standard at the time drew parallels between the Riot Club, the subject of Posh, and the Bullingdon Club, an exclusive Oxford University dining society. On 11 May 2012, an updated version of Posh opened at the Duke of York's Theatre in London, Wade's first play to appear in the West End. A film adaptation of the play, The Riot Club, written by Wade and directed by Lone Scherfig, was released in 2014. In February 2015, the regional premiere of Posh was co-produced by Nottingham Playhouse and Salisbury Playhouse.

In 2015, Wade adapted Sarah Waters' novel Tipping the Velvet into a stage play. The play premiered at Lyric Hammersmith in September 2015, before transferring to the Royal Lyceum Theatre, Edinburgh.

On 4 July 2018, Wade's play Home, I'm Darling premiered at Theatr Clwyd. It was directed by Tamara Harvey, and starred Katherine Parkinson. The play transferred to the National Theatre for a summer 2018 run and to the Duke of York's Theatre in January 2019, and later won Best Comedy at the 2019 Laurence Olivier Awards.

Wade adapted the unfinished Jane Austen novel The Watsons into a play, which premiered at Chichester Festival Theatre on 3 November 2018, directed by Samuel West. It had a further run at the Menier Chocolate Factory from 20 September 2019. The West End transfer of The Watsons was delayed by the COVID-19 pandemic.

Wade's plays are published by Oberon Books in the UK and by Dramatists Play Service in the US.

On 25 August 2022, it was announced that Wade would be one of the writers and executive producers of the new Disney+ series Rivals, based on the novel by Jilly Cooper. The series premiered on 18 October 2024.

In 2025, Wade adapted W. Somerset Maugham's The Constant Wife and reunited with director Tamara Harvey for a new production with the Royal Shakespeare Company. It was staged at the Stratford Swan Theatre starring Rose Leslie, then toured the UK in 2026 starring Kara Tointon, prior to a planned West End residency. It was produced by David Pugh, with set and costumes designed by Anna Fleischle and Cat Fuller, and a score by Jamie Cullum.

== Personal life ==
From 2007 to 2011, Wade lived with actor Samuel West, son of actors Timothy West and Prunella Scales. After a two-year separation, Wade and West reunited. The couple have two daughters, born in 2014 and 2017.

== Plays ==
=== Published ===
- Colder Than Here, 2005, premiered at the Soho Theatre
  - American premiere, produced by MCC Theater, New York, September 2005
- Breathing Corpses, 2005, premiered at the Royal Court Theatre
  - American premiere, produced by Luna Theater Company at Walnut Street Theatre, Philadelphia, October 2007
- Other Hands, 2006, premiered at the Soho Theatre
  - American premiere, produced by Luna Theater Company at Walnut Street Theatre, Philadelphia, January 2010
- Catch, 2006, premiered at the Royal Court Theatre
- Alice, 2010, premiered at the Sheffield Crucible
- Posh, 2010, premiered at the Royal Court Theatre
- Tipping the Velvet, 2015, premiered at Lyric Theatre Hammersmith
- The Watsons, 2018, premiered at the Chichester Festival Theatre
- Home, I'm Darling, 2018, premiered at Theatr Clwyd
- The Constant Wife, 2025, premiered at the RSC Stratford Swan Theatre

=== Unpublished ===
- Limbo, Sheffield Crucible Studio, 1996
- Fear of Flying, Bristol University, 1997
- White Feathers, Bristol University, 1999
- 16 Winters, Bristol Old Vic Basement, 2000
- The Wild Swans, Playbox Theatre, Warwick, 2000
- TwelveMachine, Playbox Theatre, Warwick, 2001
- The Last Child, Playbox Theatre, Warwick, 2002
- Young Emma, Finborough Theatre, 2003
- Kreutzer versus Kreutzer, Australian Chamber Orchestra, Melbourne Town Hall, 2010

== Filmography ==
- The Riot Club (film; 2014)
- Rivals (TV series; 2024–present)

== Awards ==
- Critics' Circle Theatre Award for Most Promising Playwright for Breathing Corpses and Colder Than Here, 2005
- Pearson Playwrights Award Bursary in association with the Finborough Theatre, 2004
- Pearson Playwrights Best Play Award for Breathing Corpses, 2005
- Joint winner of the George Devine Award for Breathing Corpses, 2006
- Olivier Award Nomination for Outstanding Achievement in an Affiliate Theatre for Breathing Corpses and Colder Than Here, 2006
- Olivier Award Winner for Best Comedy for Home, I'm Darling, 2019
