= Max Trewin =

Australian rules footballer

Personal information
- Full name: Max Trewin
- Born: 2 January 1927
- Died: 19 April 2005 (aged 78)
- Original team: Portarlington
- Height: 183 cm (6 ft 0 in)
- Weight: 83 kg (183 lb)

Playing career^{1}
Years	Club	Games (Goals)
1948	Geelong	6 (2)
- ^{1} Playing statistics correct to the end of 1948.

Max Trewin (2 January 1927 – 19 April 2005) was an Australian rules footballer who played with Geelong in the Victorian Football League (VFL).
