= Wendy Monk =

English writer and critic

Wendy Elizabeth Monk (19 July 1915 – 4 January 2000) was an English writer and critic.

== Publications as Wendy Monk ==
=== John Gill of Penryn ===
Wendy Monk wrote and published a biography of her great-grandfather, John Gill, a printer and bookbinder of Penryn in Cornwall. Gill was a Quaker and a propagandist for the peace resolution of disputes between nations. Wendy Monk was the daughter of Richard Gill Monk, who was the son of Richard Rugg Monk of Plymouth and his wife, Maria Jane Gill, daughter of John Gill, the subject of the biography. The book was published around 1971.

=== Caroline Fox's Journal ===
Wendy Monk was the editor of The Journal of Caroline Fox: a selection (1972). Caroline Fox, a member of the Fox family of Falmouth, recorded memories of many distinguished people, such as John Stuart Mill, John Sterling and Thomas Carlyle.

== Personal life ==
Monk was the wife of theatre critic J. C. Trewin (1908–1990), whom she married on 4 October 1938. They were "an inseparable couple, whose shared interests also bore fruit in literary collaboration, they had two sons": Ion and Mark Antony. Since 2000, an award has been given by the Critics' Circle for the best Shakespearean performance of the Year: "The John and Wendy Trewin Award for Best Shakespearean Performance".

=== The Times ===
Wendy Monk wrote a small number of feature articles for The Times between 1967 and 1977

- The Times,
  - Thursday, 27 April 1967; p. 9; Issue 56926; col "A New horizons for WI's". (Interview with the Marchioness of Anglesey, Chair of the National Federation of Women's Institutes).
  - Friday, 28 July 1967; p. 7; Issue 57005; col F "A complicated life is no comedy" (Interview with Celia Johnson).
  - Friday, 7 February 1969; p. 8; Issue 57479; col A "Mary Greaves: always on the move" (Interview with polio survivor and disability activist).
  - Friday, 27 May 1977; p. XI; Issue 60014; col C "Never a blink" (Review of The Queen's Scotland: Argyll and Bute by Nigel Tranter).

== Publications as Wendy Trewin ==
- All on Stage: Charles Wyndham and the Alberys (1980). ISBN 0-245-53444-X
- The Royal General Theatrical Fund: a history, 1838–1988 (1989). ISBN 0-85430-046-5
- The Arts Theatre, London, 1927–1981 (1986). ISBN 0-85430041-4 (With J. C. Trewin)
