= Theatr Clwyd =

Arts centre and theatre in Mold, Wales

Coordinates: 53.1793°N 3.1368°W

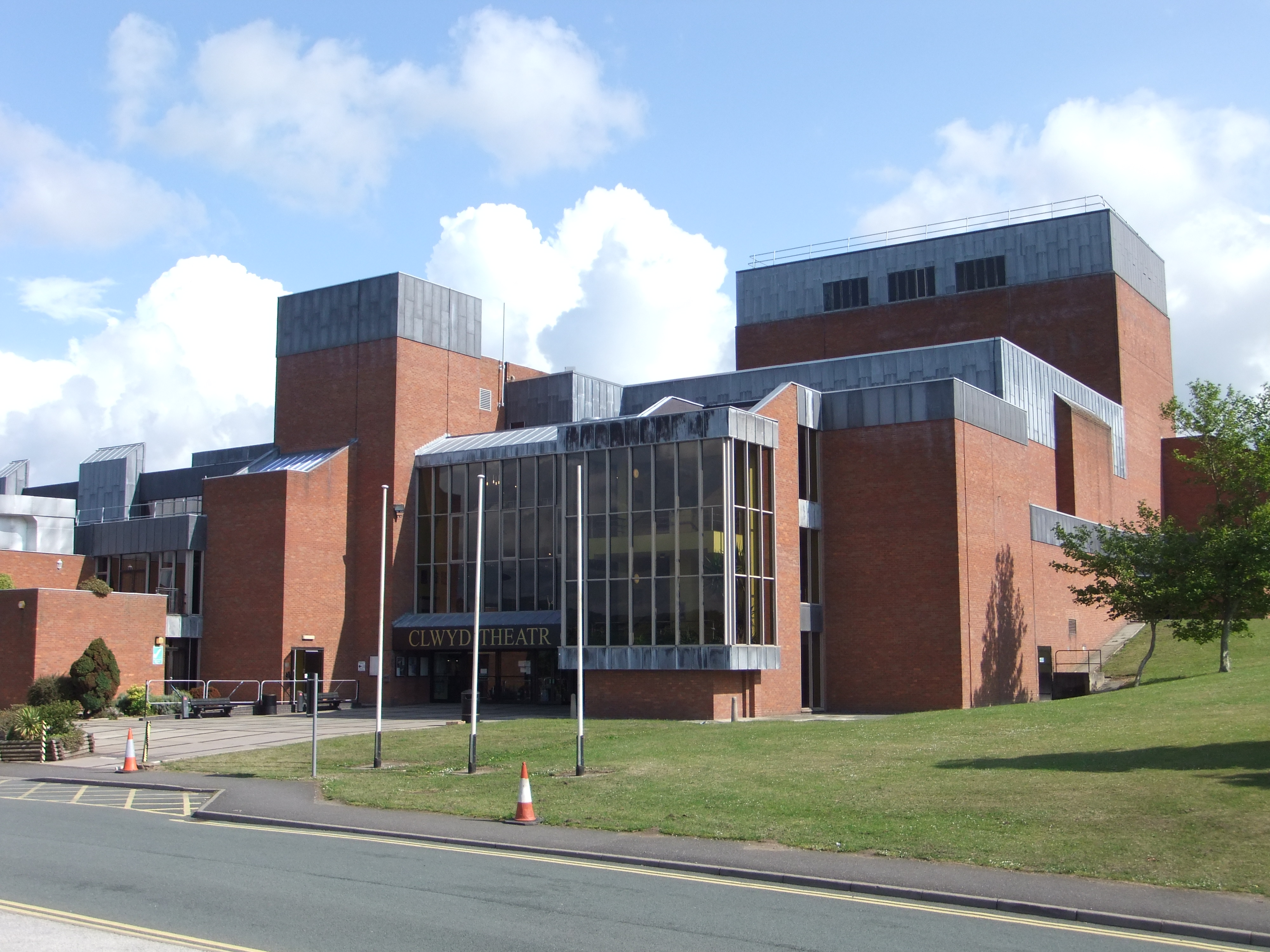
Theatr Clwyd

Theatr Clwyd (Welsh pronunciation: [ˈθeːatr ˈklʊɨd]) is a regional arts centre and producing theatre 1 mile (1.6 km) from Mold, Flintshire, in North East Wales. It opened as Theatr Clwyd in 1976, but was known between 1998 and 2015 as Clwyd Theatr Cymru, before reverting to its original name.

== History ==
Theatr Clwyd opened in 1976. It forms part of the County Civic Centre at Mold (Yr Wyddgrug), being immediately adjacent to the County Hall (the administrative offices of the former administrative county of Clwyd, now the offices of the Flintshire County Council). It was built at the instigation of the former Flintshire County Council before that was abolished in the local government reorganisation of 1974 and replaced by Clwyd County Council.

The name of the complex was changed to Clwyd Theatr Cymru in 1998 to reflect the reorganisation of local government at that time which abolished Clwyd as a county and brought Flintshire back into existence, although defined by different borders from the original ones. However, in 2015 the complex reverted to its original name.

The complex was opened by Queen Elizabeth II under the artistic direction of George Roman. Toby Robertson was the theatre's artistic director between 1985 and 1992. Robertson introduced several leading actors, including Vanessa Redgrave, Sir Michael Hordern and Timothy Dalton, to the theatre. Robertson was succeeded as artistic director by Helena Kaut-Howson

Terry Hands as artistic director 1997 to 2015 raised the profile and status of the theatre greatly. Hands' productions of classic dramatists, principally Shakespeare, were critically acclaimed. He worked closely with Associate Director Tim Baker, who was responsible for much of the theatre's work for young people throughout this period as well as directing many other dramas and musicals, along with visiting/trainee directors Phillip Breen (directing classic and modern drama) and Kate Wasserberg (directing revivals of modern dramatists including Brian Friel, Terry Johnson, Arthur Miller and Arnold Wesker).

In 2014 Terry Hands directed a revival of "Under Milk Wood" to mark the centenary of the birth of Dylan Thomas. It was critically acclaimed, and toured Wales and England to an audience of 44,000.

Hands' successor, Tamara Harvey, was appointed in June 2015. Notable productions included "Uncle Vanya", "Pavilion" and "Home, I'm Darling", a co-production with the National Theatre, which won an Olivier award and starred Katherine Parkinson and Richard Harrington. "Home, I'm Darling" transferred firstly to the National Theatre and then the West End and a UK tour.

Harvey was joined by Executive Director Liam Evans-Ford who together were instrumental in driving the venue's major capital redevelopment. Whilst major redevelopment of the theatre building took place in 2023/4 a temporary facility was created on an adjacent site with foyer, "actor's village" and a temporary theatre called "The Mix" which allowed the theatre to continue operating as a producing and presenting venue.

In 2022 Theatr Clwyd took over the running of Wrexham's William Aston Hall, ensuring that the venue remained open and viable as a community resource.

In 2023 Kate Wasserberg became Theatr Clwyd's sixth Artistic Director, replacing Tamara Harvey who became joint Artistic Director (alongside Daniel Evans) at the Royal Shakespeare Company.

== Auditoria ==
The complex contains five auditoria:

- The Anthony Hopkins Theatre (570 seats)
- The Emlyn Williams Theatre (adaptable studio space, up to 250 seats)
- Studio 2 (adaptable studio space, up to 120 seats)
- The Clwyd Room (multifunction area, up to 300 seats)
- Cinema (120 seats).

== Artistic directors ==
- George Roman (1976 – 1985)
- Toby Robertson (1985 – 1992)
- Helena Kaut-Howson (1992 – 1995)
- Terry Hands (1997 – 2015)
- Tamara Harvey (2015 – 2023)
- Kate Wasserberg (2023 – present)
