= J. C. Trewin =

English journalist (1908–1990)

J. C. Trewin OBE
- Born: John Courtenay Trewin; 4 December 1908; Plymouth, Devon, England
- Died: 16 February 1990 (aged 81)
- Occupations: Journalist, writer, drama critic

John Courtenay Trewin OBE (4 December 1908 – 16 February 1990) was a British journalist, writer and drama critic.

Trewin was born in Plymouth, Devon, although both his parents were Cornish. He was educated at Plymouth College and in 1926 joined the Western Independent as a cub reporter. He moved to London in 1932 and joined the Morning Post, transferring to The Observer in 1937. He served as drama critic on the paper for more than 60 years. His also wrote a drama column for The Listener (1951–57), and contributed regular notices to Punch (1944–45), John O'London's Weekly (1945–54), The Sketch (1947–59), the Illustrated London News (1947–88), The Lady (from 1949) and the Birmingham Post.

Among other productions, his memoir A Play Tonight, published in 1952 by Elek Books, New York, reviewed the June 1951 revival of the York Mystery Plays, performed for the first time there since 1570 during the York Festival, as part of the Festival of Britain. Paul Scofield (1956) was an illustrated study of the actor's work, as was John Neville (1961) of his work.

He was appointed Officer of the Order of the British Empire (OBE) in the 1981 Birthday Honours for services to theatre.

He married Wendy Monk (1915–2000), also a critic, in 1938. The couple had two sons, Mark Antony Trewin and Ion Trewin (who eventually became the administrator of the Man Booker Prize from 2006).

From 2000 to 2015, the John And Wendy Trewin Award For Best Shakespearian Performance was given by The Critics' Circle in memory of Trewin and his wife. In 2016, after their son Ion died, the award was renamed the Trewin Award For Best Shakespearian Performance and the first recipient was Dame Judi Dench.

== Sources ==
- Donald Roy, "Trewin, John Courtenay", Dictionary of National Biography
