= Anna Fleischle =

German theatre designer

- Born: 1971; Munich
- Education: Central Saint Martins
- Occupations: Set and costume design

Anna Fleischle is a theatre designer who has worked in theatre, dance and opera.

In 2007 Fleischle designed Love and Money at the new Maria, Young Vic, which was nominated for an Olivier Award for outstanding achievement in an affiliate theatre.

She designed the world tour and National Theatre, DV8 production Can We Talk About This?, which won the 2012 Helpmann Award for Best Ballet or Dance Work and was Tanz magazine's "production of the year". She worked again with Lloyd Newson on DV8's next work, John, in 2015

Fleischle designed productions of Michael Tippett's opera King Priam and Britten's operetta Paul Bunyan for the English Touring Opera, which together won the Laurence Olivier Award for Outstanding Achievement in Opera in 2014.

Her 2015 design for Hangmen by Martin McDonagh, directed by Matthew Dunster won Best Design at the Evening Standard Theatre Awards, Best Designer at the Critics' Circle Theatre Awards. and the 2016 Olivier award for best set design. The production went on to win in the theatre category at the South Bank Sky Arts Awards. In December the same year she designed the set for Complicite's production of Beware of Pity by Stefan Zweig at the Schaubühne in Berlin.

In 2016, she designed Matthew Perry's debut play The End of Longing. In 2018 she continued her collaboration with McDonagh & Dunster, designing set and costumes for A Very Very Very Dark Matter at The Bridge.

In 2019 she was nominated for Best Set and Best Costume design at the Oliver Awards for Home, I'm Darling at the National Theatre and Duke Of Yorks Theatre.
