= Under the Blue Sky =

Play written by David Eldridge

- Original language: English
- Written by: David Eldridge
- Genre: Drama

Premiere
- Date: 14 September 2000

Under the Blue Sky is a three-act play written by David Eldridge. It premiered at the Royal Court Theatre in London on 14 September 2000, directed by Rufus Norris.

== Original West End production ==
The original West End production opened at the Duke of York's Theatre on 25 July 2008, directed by Anna Mackmin. The cast included Francesca Annis, Chris O'Dowd, Catherine Tate, Nigel Lindsay, Dominic Rowan and Lisa Dillon.

== Reception ==
=== Critical response ===
Under the Blue Sky was received very positively from theatre critics. Louis Wise of The Sunday Times said: "Composed of three successive duologues, Under the Blue Sky is essentially a two-parter: a farcical build-up, hysterical in all senses of the word, as Helen tries to woo Nick and Michelle rejects Graham; then a cathartic release, as Anne and Robert tackle their own problematic relationship."

=== Awards ===
- Won: 2009 What's On Stage Theatregoers' Choice Award for Books Best New Play
