= Ion Trewin =

British editor, publisher and author

- Born: Ion Courtenay Gill Trewin; 13 July 1943; London, England
- Died: 8 April 2015 (aged 71)
- Education: Highgate School
- Occupations: Editor, Publisher and author
- Parent(s): J. C. Trewin and Wendy Trewin

Ion Courtenay Gill Trewin (13 July 1943 – 8 April 2015) was a British editor, publisher and author.

== Biography ==
Born in London, the son of J. C. Trewin and Wendy Trewin (née Monk), Ion Trewin was educated at Highgate School. He was the literary editor of The Times from 1972 to 1979 and then became an editor with Hodder & Stoughton (for whom he published Thomas Keneally's Schindler's Ark in 1982) until 1992 and Orion Publishing Group to 2006. Trewin was said to have "an unmatched reputation as a publisher of taste and acumen".

He was director of the Man Booker Prize for a decade and was the biographer of the politician Alan Clark. Trewin also edited the three volumes of Clark's diaries.

Trewin died of cancer at the age of 71.
