= Charlotte Jones (writer) =

British writer

- Born: 2 June 1968 (age 58); England
- Education: Balliol College, Oxford University and Webber Douglas Academy of Dramatic Art
- Occupations: Playwright, screenwriter
- Known for: Bob's Weekend (1996), Without You (2012)
- Spouse: Paul Bazely (m. 1998)
- Children: 2

Charlotte Jones (born 2 June 1968) is a British screenwriter and playwright.

== Career ==
Her first play Airswimming debuted in 1997 at the Battersea Arts Centre in London. Her other plays include In Flame, The Dark, The Lightning Play, and Humble Boy. Charlotte Jones wrote the book to the 2004-2006 West End musical, The Woman in White, in collaboration with the David Zippel and Andrew Lloyd Webber.

On television, Jones wrote episodes of Always and Everyone and The Palace. She created the ITV period drama The Halcyon. It is set in 1940 and focuses on a five-star hotel at the centre of London Society and a world at war. The series was first announced on 3 December 2015, before the official cast was announced on 4 April 2016, with Steven Mackintosh and Olivia Williams playing major roles. The series was cancelled after one series. In 2018, Humble Boy was revived at the Orange Tree Theatre and The Meeting debuted at Chichester Festival Theatre.

Jones will adapt Will Dean's Tuva Moodyson novels to television for Red Planet Pictures. Rose Ayling-Ellis is attached to play the lead role.

== Awards ==
She won the 2001 Susan Smith Blackburn Prize.
