= Patrick Stewart on stage and screen =

Film, television and stage performances of Sir Patrick Stewart

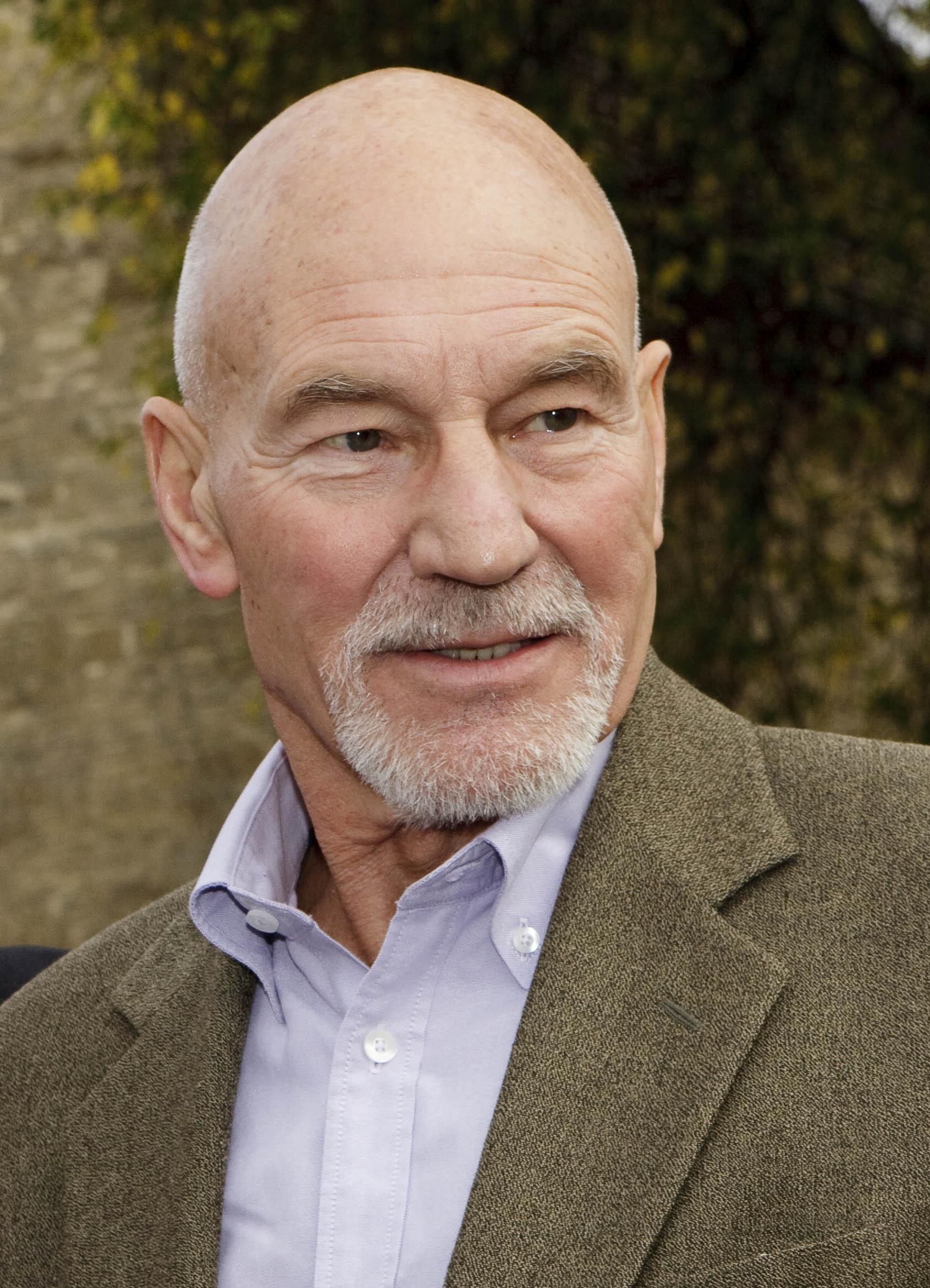
Stewart in September 2009

Patrick Stewart (1940–2026) was an English actor who had an extensive career in film, television and on stage spanning over 60 years. Stewart won a Grammy Award and two Laurence Olivier Awards and was nominated for numerous accolades including three Golden Globe Awards, four Primetime Emmy Awards, three Screen Actors Guild Awards, and a Tony Award.

Stewart was known for his film roles in: Hedda (1975), Excalibur (1981), Dune (1984), Robin Hood: Men in Tights (1993), Jeffrey (1995), Match (2014), Green Room (2015), and The Kid Who Would Be King (2019). He starred in several blockbuster films, portraying Professor Charles Xavier in: X-Men (2000), X2 (2003), X-Men: The Last Stand (2006), X-Men Origins: Wolverine (2009), The Wolverine (2013), X-Men: Days of Future Past (2014), Logan (2017), Doctor Strange in the Multiverse of Madness (2022), and the upcoming Avengers: Doomsday (2026). He gained worldwide acclaim for his role as Jean-Luc Picard in the science-fiction series Star Trek: The Next Generation from 1987 to 1994 and starred in the films Star Trek Generations (1994), Star Trek: First Contact (1996), Star Trek: Insurrection (1998), and Star Trek: Nemesis (2002). He returned to the role in the series Star Trek: Picard from 2020 to 2023.

== Filmography ==
=== Film ===
Year	Title	Role	Notes	Ref.
1975	Hedda	Ejlert Løvborg		
1975	Hennessy	Tilney		
1980	Little Lord Fauntleroy	Wilkins		
1981	Excalibur	Leondegrance		
1982	The Plague Dogs	Major	Voice	
1984	Dune	Gurney Halleck		
1985	Code Name: Emerald	Col. Peters		
1985	The Doctor and the Devils	Prof. Macklin		
1985	Lifeforce	Doctor Armstrong		
1985	Wild Geese II	Russian General		
1986	Lady Jane	Henry Grey, 1st Duke of Suffolk		
1991	L.A. Story	Mr. Perdue		
1993	Robin Hood: Men in Tights	Richard I		
1994	Gunmen	Loomis		
1994	The Pagemaster	Adventure	Voice	
1994	Star Trek Generations	Jean-Luc Picard		
1995	Jeffrey	Sterling		
1995	Let It Be Me	John		
1996	Star Trek: First Contact	Jean-Luc Picard		
1997	Conspiracy Theory	Dr. Jonas		
1997	Masterminds	Bentley		
1998	Dad Savage	Dad Savage		
1998	The Prince of Egypt	Seti	Voice	
1998	Safe House	Mace Sowell		
1998	Star Trek: Insurrection	Jean-Luc Picard	Also associate producer	
2000	X-Men	Professor Charles Xavier		
2001	Jimmy Neutron: Boy Genius	King Goobot V	Voice	
2002	Star Trek: Nemesis	Jean-Luc Picard		
2003	X2	Professor Charles Xavier		
2004	Boo, Zino & the Snurks	Albert Drollinger	Voice; English dub	
2005	Chicken Little	Mr. Woolensworth	Voice	
2005	The Game of Their Lives	Older Dent McSkimming		
2005	Nausicaä of the Valley of the Wind	Lord Yupa	Voice; English dub	
2005	Steamboy	Lloyd Steam	Voice; English dub	
2006	Bambi II	The Great Prince	Voice; Direct to video	
2006	X-Men: The Last Stand	Professor Charles Xavier		
2007	TMNT	Winters	Voice	
2009	X-Men Origins: Wolverine	Professor Charles Xavier	Cameo, uncredited	
2011	Gnomeo & Juliet	Bill Shakespeare	Voice	
2012	Ice Age: Continental Drift	Ariscratle	Voice	
2012	Ted	Narrator	Voice	
2013	Hunting Elephants	Lord Michael Simpson		
2013	The Wolverine	Professor Charles Xavier	Cameo, uncredited	
2013	Legends of Oz: Dorothy's Return	Tugg	Voice	
2014	Match	Tobi Powell		
2014	X-Men: Days of Future Past	Professor Charles Xavier	Shared role with James McAvoy	
2015	Christmas Eve	Harris		
2015	Green Room	Darcy		
2015	Ted 2	Narrator	Voice	
2016	Spark: A Space Tail	The Captain	Voice	
2017	Dragonheart: Battle for the Heartfire	Drago	Voice	
2017	The Emoji Movie	Poop	Voice	
2017	Logan	Professor Charles Xavier		
2017	The Wilde Wedding	Harold		
2018	Postcards from the 48%	Himself	Documentary	
2019	Charlie's Angels	John Bosley		
2019	Coda	Henry Cole		
2019	The Kid Who Would Be King	Adult Merlin		
2020	Dragon Rider	Nettlebrand	Voice	
2022	Doctor Strange in the Multiverse of Madness	Professor Charles Xavier (Earth-838)	Cameo	
2026	The Sheep Detectives	Sir Ritchfield	Voice	
2026	Avengers: Doomsday †	Professor Charles Xavier (Earth-10005)	Post-production, posthumous release	

=== Television ===
Year	Title	Role	Notes	Ref.
1967	Coronation Street	Fire Officer	Episode #1.638	
1969	Civilisation	Horatio	Episode: "Protest and Communication"	
1974	Fall of Eagles	Vladimir Lenin	Miniseries, 3 episodes	
1974	Antony and Cleopatra	Enobarbus	Television film	
1974	The Gathering Storm	Clement Attlee	Television film	
1975	Joby	Reg Weston	Miniseries, 2 episodes	
1975	North & South	John Thornton	Miniseries, 4 episodes	
1976	I, Claudius	Sejanus	Miniseries, 4 episodes	
1977	Jackanory	Narrator	Voice, 5 episodes	
1979	Tinker Tailor Soldier Spy	Karla	Miniseries, episode: "How It All Fits Together"	
1980	Hamlet, Prince of Denmark	Claudius	Television film	
1982	Smiley's People	Karla	Miniseries, episode: "Smiley's Lighter	
1984	Pope John Paul II	Władysław Gomułka	Television film	
1987–1994	Star Trek: The Next Generation	Jean-Luc Picard	Main role, 176 episodes	
1988	Reading Rainbow	Himself	Episode: "The Bionic Bunny Show"	
1992	Nova	Narrator	Episode: "Mind of a Serial Killer"	
1993	Star Trek: Deep Space Nine	Jean-Luc Picard	Episode: "Emissary"	
1993	Death Train	Malcolm Philpott	Television film	
1994	Saturday Night Live	Himself	Host; episode: "Patrick Stewart / Salt-N-Pepa"	
1995	500 Nations	Narrator	Voice, 8 episodes	
1995, 2013	The Simpsons	Number One; Homer's Unnamed Co-worker	Voice, 2 episodes	
1996	The Canterville Ghost	Sir Simon de Canterville	Television film; also co-producer	
1998	Moby Dick	Captain Ahab	Miniseries	
1999	A Christmas Carol	Ebenezer Scrooge	Television film; also executive producer	
1999	Animal Farm	Napoleon	Voice, television film	
2002	King of Texas	John Lear	Television film; also executive producer	
2003	Frasier	Alastair Burke	Episode: "The Doctor Is Out"	
2003	The Lion in Winter	King Henry II	Television film; also executive producer	
2004	The Last Dragon	Narrator	Voice, television film	
2005	The Snow Queen	The Raven	Voice, television film	
2005	Mysterious Island	Captain Nemo	Television film	
2005	Extras	Himself	Episode: "Patrick Stewart"	
2005–2014, 2018	Family Guy	Various characters	Voice, 16 episodes	
2005–2026	American Dad!	Avery Bullock	Voice, 125 episodes	
2006	Eleventh Hour	Ian Hood	4 episodes	
2009	Hamlet	King Claudius / King Hamlet	Television film	
2010	Macbeth	Macbeth	Television film	
2012	The Daily Show	Himself	Correspondent, 7 episodes	
2012	Futurama	Huntmaster	Voice, episode: "31st Century Fox"	
2012	The Hollow Crown	John of Gaunt	Episode: "Richard II"	
2012–2014	Robot Chicken	Various characters	Voice, 3 episodes	
2014	Cosmos: A Spacetime Odyssey	William Herschel	Voice, episode: "A Sky Full of Ghosts"	
2015–2016	Blunt Talk	Walter Blunt	Main role, 20 episodes	
2015	Oscar's Hotel for Fantastical Creatures	Albert	Voice, episode: "Fishy Business"	
2016	Unbreakable Kimmy Schmidt	Himself	Voice, episode: "Kimmy Kidnaps Gretchen!"	
2019	Breakthrough: The Ideas That Changed the World	Narrator	Voice, documentary	
2020	Cosmos: Possible Worlds	William Herschel	Voice, episode: "Lost City of Life"	
2020–2023	Star Trek: Picard	Jean-Luc Picard	Main role, 30 episodes; also executive producer	
2026	Bait	"Pigtrick" Stewart	Voice, 2 episodes	

== Video games ==
Year	Title	Role	Ref.
1994	Lands of Lore: The Throne of Chaos	Richard, Ruler of Gladstone	
1995	Star Trek: The Next Generation - A Final Unity	Capt. Jean-Luc Picard	
1997	Star Trek Generations	Capt. Jean-Luc Picard	
1999	Star Trek: Hidden Evil	Capt. Jean-Luc Picard	
2000	Star Trek: Invasion	Capt. Jean-Luc Picard	
2000	Star Trek: Armada	Jean-Luc Picard / Locutus of Borg clone	
2001	Star Trek: Armada II	Jean-Luc Picard	
2002	Star Trek: Bridge Commander	Jean-Luc Picard	
2002	Star Trek: Starfleet Command III	Jean-Luc Picard	
2002	X-Men: Next Dimension	Charles Xavier	
2003	X2: Wolverine's Revenge	Charles Xavier	
2003	Star Trek: Elite Force II	Jean-Luc Picard	
2004	Forgotten Realms: Demon Stone	Khelban "Blackstaff" Arunsun	
2004	X-Men Legends	Charles Xavier	
2005	X-Men Legends II: Rise of Apocalypse	Charles Xavier	
2006	The Elder Scrolls IV: Oblivion	Emperor Uriel Septim VII	
2006	X-Men: The Official Game	Charles Xavier	
2006	Star Trek: Legacy	Jean-Luc Picard	
2010	Castlevania: Lords of Shadow	Zobek / Death	
2010	Lego Universe	Narrator	
2011	The Sims Medieval	Narrator	
2011	War of the Worlds	Narrator	
2014	Castlevania: Lords of Shadow 2	Zobek	
2014	Family Guy: The Quest for Stuff	Himself / Jean-Luc Picard	
2015	Leonardo's Cat	Leonardo da Vinci	
2018	My Memory of Us	Narrator	
2019	Shadow Point	Narrator	
2019	Felix the Reaper	Narrator	
2025	The Elder Scrolls IV: Oblivion Remastered	Emperor Uriel Septim VII; archive audio	

== Stage ==
Year	Title	Role	Playwright	Venue	Ref.
1965	The Life of Galileo	Galileo Galilei	Bertolt Brecht	Bristol Old Vic, Bristol	
1965	The Merchant of Venice	Shylock	William Shakespeare	Bristol Old Vic, Bristol	
1966	Hamlet	Player King	William Shakespeare	Royal Shakespeare Theatre	
1966	Henry V	Dauphin of France	William Shakespeare	Royal Shakespeare Theatre	
1967	The Taming of the Shrew	Grumio	William Shakespeare	Royal Shakespeare Theatre	
1968	King Lear	Duke of Cornwall	William Shakespeare	Royal Shakespeare Theatre, London	
1969	Bartholomew Fair	Lantern Leatherhead	Ben Jonson	Aldwych Theatre, London	
1970–1971	Two Gentlemen of Verona	Launce	William Shakespeare	Aldwych Theatre, London; Royal Shakespeare Theatre	
1971	A Midsummer's Night Dream	Tom Snout	William Shakespeare	Billy Rose Theatre, Broadway	
1975	Hedda Gabler	Eilert Lovborg	Henrik Ibsen	Royal Shakespeare Theatre (Australian tour)	
1976	Bingo	Shakespeare	Edward Bond	The Other Place	
1977–1978	A Midsummer's Night Dream	Oberon	William Shakespeare	Aldwych Theatre; Royal Shakespeare Theatre	
1978	A Miserable Lonely Death	Colonel Goosen	Norman Fenton, Ron Blair	Aldwych Theatre; Royal Shakespeare Theatre	
1981–1982	Two Gentlemen of Verona	Sir Eglamour	William Shakespeare	Royal Shakespeare Theatre	
1982	Every Good Boy Deserves Favour	Doctor	Tom Stoppard	Royal Festival Hall	
1991	A Christmas Carol	Solo Performer	Charles Dickens	Eugene O'Neill Theatre, Broadway	
1992–1993	A Christmas Carol	Solo Performer	Charles Dickens	Broadhurst Theatre, Broadway	
1994–1995	A Christmas Carol	Solo Performer	Charles Dickens	Richard Rodgers Theatre, Broadway	
1995	The Tempest	Prospero	William Shakespeare	Delacorte Theater, Central Park; Broadhurst Theatre, Broadway	
1997	Othello	Othello	William Shakespeare	The Lansburgh Theatre, Washington, D.C.	
1998	The Ride Down Mt. Morgan	Lyman Felt	Arthur Miller	The Public Theater, Off-Broadway; Ambassador Theatre, Broadway	
2001	Who's Afraid of Virginia Woolf?	George	Edward Albee	Guthrie Theater, Minneapolis	
2001	Johnson Over Jordan	Robert Johnson	J.B. Priestley	West Yorkshire Playhouse, Leeds	
2001	A Christmas Carol	Solo Performer	Charles Dickens	Marquis Theatre, Broadway	
2003	The Master Builder	Halvard Solness	Henrik Ibsen	Albery Theatre, London	
2003	The Caretaker	Davies	Harold Pinter	American Airlines Theatre, Broadway	
2006	The Tempest	Prospero	William Shakespeare	Royal Shakespeare Theatre; Novello Theatre, London	
2006	Antony and Cleopatra	Mark Antony	William Shakespeare	Swan Theatre, Royal Shakespeare Company	
2007	A Christmas Carol	Solo Performer	Charles Dickens	Albery Theatre, West End of London	
2007	Twelfth Night	Malvolio	William Shakespeare	Chichester Festival Theatre	
2007–2008	Macbeth	Macbeth	William Shakespeare	Gielgud Theatre, London; Brooklyn Academy of Music, New York City; Lyceum Theatre, Broadway	
2008–2009	Hamlet	Claudius / The Ghost	William Shakespeare	Royal Shakespeare Company; Novello Theatre, London	
2009	Waiting for Godot	Vladimir	Samuel Beckett	Theatre Royal Haymarket, West End (UK tour)	
2010	A Life in the Theatre	Mr. Robert	David Mamet	Gerald Schoenfeld Theatre, Broadway	
2010	Bingo: Scenes of Money and Death	William Shakespeare	Edward Bond	Chichester Festival Theatre; Young Vic Theatre	
2011	The Merchant of Venice	Shylock	William Shakespeare	Royal Shakespeare Company	
2013	No Man's Land	Hirst	Harold Pinter	Berkeley Repertory Theatre, California	
2013–2014	Waiting for Godot / No Man's Land	Vladimir/Hirst	Samuel Beckett / Harold Pinter	Cort Theatre, Broadway	
2016	No Man's Land	Hirst	Harold Pinter	Lyceum Theatre, Sheffield Theatre Royal, Newcastle	
