= List of awards and nominations received by Patrick Stewart =

Sir Patrick Stewart awards and nominations
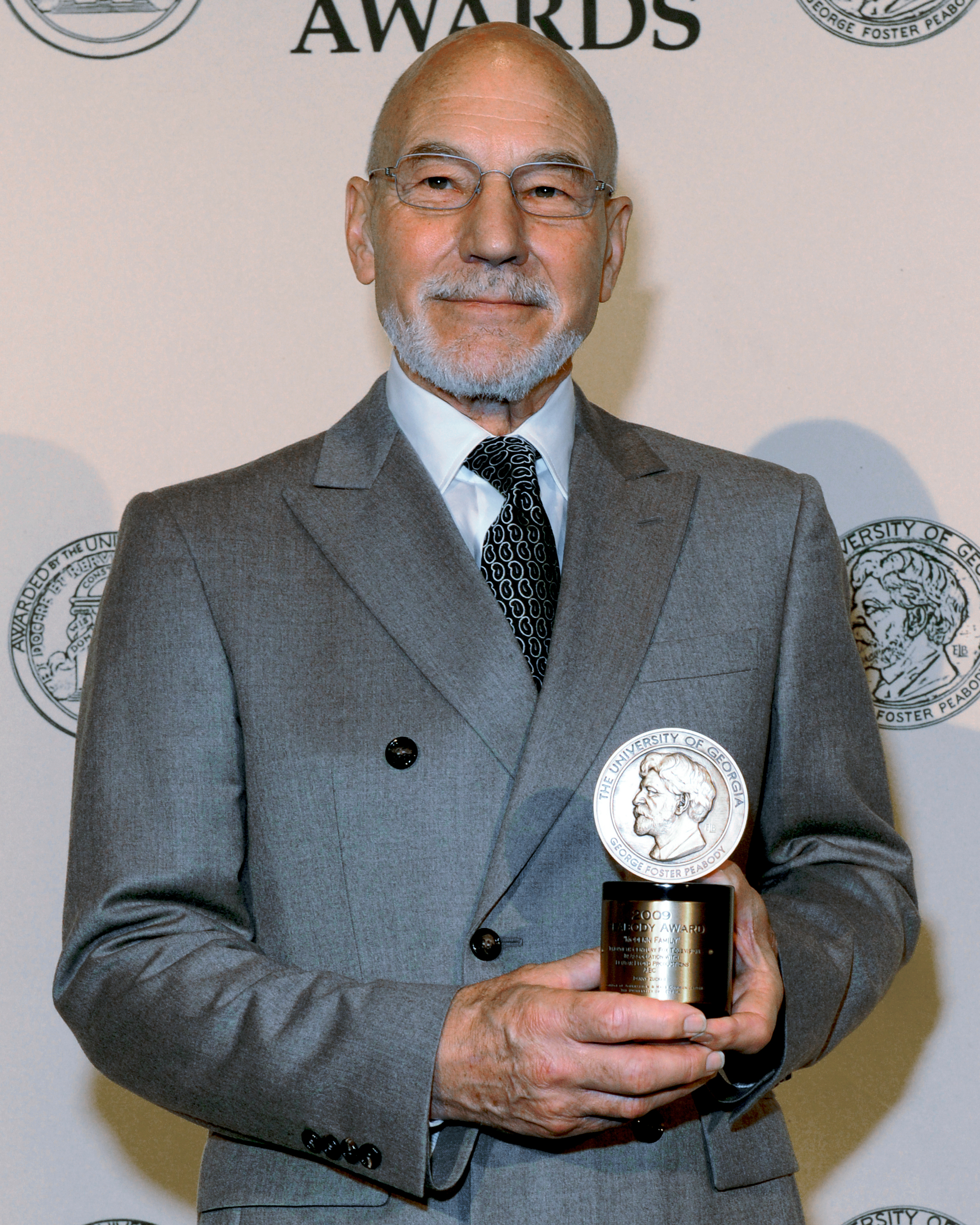
- Sir Patrick Stewart accepting a Special Peabody Award at the ceremony on behalf of the cast and crew of Star Trek: The Next Generation in 2012
Awards and nominations
Award	Wins	Nominations
Actor Awards	0	3
Critics' Choice Awards	1	3
Emmy Awards	0	4
Golden Globe Awards	0	3
Grammy Awards	1	3
Olivier Award	2	5
Tony Award	0	1

Totals (Note: Certain award groups do not simply award one winner. They acknowledge several different recipients, have runners-up, and have third place. Since this is a specific recognition and is different from losing an award, runner-up mentions are considered wins in this award tally. For simplification and to avoid errors, each award in this list has been presumed to have had a prior nomination.)
- Wins: 11
- Nominations: 43

Sir Patrick Stewart was an English actor known for his roles on stage and screen. His accolades include two Laurence Olivier Awards, a Critics' Choice Award and a Grammy Award as well as nominations for three Actor Awards, four Emmy Awards, three Golden Globe Awards, and a Tony Award. He was honored with a star on the Hollywood Walk of Fame in 1996 and was knighted by Queen Elizabeth II in 2010.

Stewart was noted as a Shakespearian actor having worked with the Royal Shakespeare Company and in productions with the Royal National Theatre. On the West End stage, he earned two Laurence Olivier Awards for Best Actor in a Supporting Role for playing Enobarbus in Antony and Cleopatra (1979), and King Claudius in Hamlet (2009). He was Olivier-nominated for Actor of the Year in a Revival playing Shylock in The Merchant of Venice (1979) and for Best Actor of the Year playing Ebenezer Scrooge in A Christmas Carol (1994), and the title role in Macbeth (2008).

He made his Broadway debut in A Midsummer Night's Dream (1971) and returned for 11 more productions throughout his career. Stewart later played the title role in Macbeth (2008) earning a nomination for the Tony Award for Best Actor in a Play. He won the Drama Desk Award for Outstanding Solo Performance for his portrayal of Ebenezer Scrooge in a production adapted by Stewart based on Charles Dickens story A Christmas Carol (1992). He also received two Outer Critics Circle Awards nominations for the Shakespearian tragedies The Tempest (1996) and Macbeth (2008).

For his role as Jean-Luc Picard in the sci-fi series Star Trek: The Next Generation (1987–1994) he was nominated for the Actor Award for Outstanding Actor in a Drama Series. He returned to the role in Star Trek: Picard (2022–2023) earning a Critics' Choice Super Award for Best Actor in a Science Fiction/Fantasy Series. He received Primetime Emmy Award nominations for playing Captain Ahab in the miniseries Moby Dick (1998), King Henry II in the film The Lion in Winter (2003), himself in the sitcom Extras (2005), and King Claudius in the PBS production of Hamlet (2009).

On film, Stewart gained international stardom for his portrayal of Professor Xavier in the X-Men film franchise (2000–2026) which includes the action drama Logan (2017) for which he earned critical acclaim, the Astra Film Award for Best Supporting Actor and the Saturn Award for Best Supporting Actor as well as a nomination for the Critics' Choice Movie Award for Best Supporting Actor. He reprised his role as Picard in Star Trek: First Contact (1996) and played Professor X in X-Men (2000), he was nominated for Saturn Awards for Best Actor and Best Supporting Actor.

Known for his commanding and clear baritone voice, he won the Grammy Award for Best Spoken Word Album for Children for Peter and the Wolf (1996) as was further nominated for two Grammy Awards for Best Spoken Word Album for A Christmas Carol (1992) and The Complete Shakespeare Sonnets (2001). Playing against type, he took a comedic role in the Seth MacFarlane produced comedy series Blunt Talk (2015–2016) for which he was nominated for the Golden Globe Award for Best Actor – Television Series Musical or Comedy.

== Major associations ==
=== Actor Awards ===
Year	Category	Nominated work	Result	Ref.
1994	Outstanding Actor in a Drama Series	Star Trek: The Next Generation	Nominated	
1999	Outstanding Actor in a Miniseries or Television Movie	A Christmas Carol	Nominated	
2010	Outstanding Actor in a Miniseries or Television Movie	Macbeth	Nominated	

=== Critics' Choice Awards ===
Critics' Choice Movie Awards
Year	Category	Nominated work	Result	Ref.
2018	Best Supporting Actor	Logan	Nominated	
Critics' Choice Super Awards
2021	Best Actor in a Science Fiction/Fantasy Series	Star Trek: Picard	Won	
2024	Best Actor in a Science Fiction/Fantasy Series	Star Trek: Picard	Nominated	

=== Emmy Awards ===
Primetime Emmy Award
Year	Category	Nominated work	Result	Ref.
1998	Outstanding Actor in a Limited Series or Movie	Moby Dick	Nominated	
2004	Outstanding Television Movie	The Lion in Winter	Nominated	
2006	Outstanding Guest Actor in a Comedy Series	Extras (episode: "Patrick Stewart")	Nominated	
2010	Outstanding Supporting Actor in a Limited Series or Movie	Hamlet	Nominated	

=== Golden Globe Awards ===
Year	Category	Nominated work	Result	Ref.
1999	Best Actor in a Miniseries or Television Film	Moby Dick	Nominated	
2005	Best Actor in a Miniseries or Television Film	The Lion in Winter	Nominated	
2016	Best Actor – Television Series Musical or Comedy	Blunt Talk	Nominated	

=== Grammy Awards ===
Year	Category	Nominated work	Result	Ref.
1993	Best Spoken Word Album	A Christmas Carol	Nominated	
1996	Best Spoken Word Album for Children	Prokofiev: Peter and the Wolf	Won	
2001	Best Spoken Word Album	The Complete Shakespeare Sonnets	Nominated	

=== Laurence Olivier Awards ===
Year	Category	Nominated work	Result	Ref.
1979	Best Actor in a Revival	The Merchant of Venice	Nominated	
1979	Best Supporting Actor	Antony and Cleopatra	Won	
1994	Best Actor	A Christmas Carol	Nominated	
2008	Best Actor	Macbeth	Nominated	
2009	Best Supporting Actor	Hamlet	Won	

=== Tony Awards ===
Year	Category	Nominated work	Result	Ref.
2008	Best Actor in a Play	Macbeth	Nominated	

== Theatre awards ==
Organizations	Year	Category	Work	Result	Ref.
Drama Desk Awards	1992	Outstanding Solo Performance	A Christmas Carol	Won	
Drama Desk Awards	1996	Outstanding Actor in a Play	The Tempest	Nominated	
Drama Desk Awards	1999	Outstanding Actor in a Play	The Ride Down Mt. Morgan	Nominated	
Outer Critics Circle Award	1996	Outstanding Actor in a Play	The Tempest	Nominated	
Outer Critics Circle Award	2008	Outstanding Actor in a Play	Macbeth	Nominated	

== Critics awards ==
Year	Award	Category	Nominated work	Result	Ref.
Detroit Film Critics Society	2017	Best Supporting Actor	Logan	Nominated	
Houston Film Critics Society	2018	Best Supporting Actor	Logan	Nominated	
North Carolina Film Critics Association	2017	Best Supporting Actor	Logan	Nominated	
North Texas Film Critics Association	2017	Best Supporting Actor	Logan	Nominated	
Phoenix Film Critics Society	2017	Best Supporting Actor	Logan	Nominated	
Seattle Film Critics Awards	2017	Best Supporting Actor	Logan	Nominated	

== Miscellaneous awards ==
Organizations	Year	Category	Work	Result	Ref.
The Astra Awards	2017	Best Supporting Actor	Logan	Won	
Saturn Awards	1990	Best Genre Actor	Star Trek: The Next Generation	Won	
Saturn Awards	1997	Best Actor	Star Trek: First Contact	Nominated	
Saturn Awards	2000	Best Actor on Television	A Christmas Carol	Nominated	
Saturn Awards	2001	Best Supporting Actor	X-Men	Nominated	
Saturn Awards	2018	Best Supporting Actor	Logan	Won	
Saturn Awards	2021	Best Actor on Television	Star Trek: Picard	Won	
Saturn Awards	2024	Best Actor on Television	Star Trek: Picard	Won	
Saturn Awards	2024	Lifetime Achievement Award	The Cast of Star Trek: The Next Generation	Won	(Note: "The Lifetime Achievement Award is usually presented to an individual for their contributions to genre entertainment. Top luminaries like Stan Lee and Leonard Nimoy, Mr. Spock himself, have received this top honor. It's not new, but we extended this award to cover the entire cast of Star Trek: The Next Generation, due to its continued influence on the face of general television. It was originally doomed to failure since it was following in the footsteps of the original Star Trek, yet it carved its own identity, and its diverse cast was light years ahead of its time!" —Academy of Science Fiction, Fantasy and Horror Films)

== Honorary awards ==
Organizations	Year	Award	Result	Ref.
Hollywood Walk of Fame	1996	Television Star	Honored	
Queen Elizabeth II	2001	Officer of the Order of the British Empire (OBE)	Honored	
Queen Elizabeth II	2010	Knight Bachelor for his services to drama	Honored	
San Diego International Film Festival	2017	Gregory Peck Award	Honored	
ICG Publicists Awards	2024	Television Showperson of the Year (Note: Career achievement including the final season of Star Trek: Picard (2020-2022))	Honored	
