= Jane Hawking =

English author and teacher (born 1944)

- Born: Jane Beryl Wilde; 29 March 1944 (age 82); St Albans, Hertfordshire, England
- Education: Westfield College, London
- Occupations: Author; teacher
- Spouses: Stephen Hawking (m. 1965; div. 1995); Jonathan Hellyer Jones (m. 1997)
- Children: 3, including Lucy

Jane Beryl Jones (née Wilde, formerly Hawking; born 29 March 1944) is an English author and teacher. She was married to Stephen Hawking for 30 years from 1965 until they divorced in 1995.

== Early life and education ==
Jane Beryl Wilde was born to George and Beryl Wilde (née Eagleton). She grew up in St Albans, Hertfordshire. She was raised in the Church of England and is a less than active Christian.

She studied languages at the University of London's Westfield College. Jane and Stephen Hawking met through mutual college friends at a party in 1962. Hawking was diagnosed with motor neuron disease (also known as amyotrophic lateral sclerosis, or ALS) in 1963. Though aware of his consequent shortened life expectancy and limitations, the couple became engaged in 1964 and married in 1965 in their shared hometown of St Albans. They had three children: Robert, born in 1967, Lucy, born in 1970, and Timothy, born in 1979.

After years of working on her doctoral thesis through Westfield College, supervised by Alan Deyermond, Jane received her PhD degree in medieval Spanish poetry in April 1981. She felt compelled to obtain a doctorate to have her own academic identity within the University of Cambridge.

Jane and Stephen Hawking separated in 1990, and divorced five years later. In 1997, she married musician Jonathan Hellyer Jones. However, she continued to support Hawking through his health problems as he continued to work. In the postlude to her 2007 memoir Travelling to Infinity, she writes about Hawking after his second divorce (from nurse Elaine Mason): "We are able to associate freely again and enjoy many a family occasion together. It has been quite like old times..."

During her marriage to Hawking, while dealing with the progression of his illness, Jane experienced depression. In a 2004 interview, she cited her Christian faith as giving her hope during her marriage and the depression she experienced as a result of being his then-caregiver. In that interview, she noted the irony in her faith-based strength to support him in light of Hawking's well-known atheism.

== Later life ==
In 1999, she wrote an autobiography about her first marriage, Music to Move the Stars: A Life with Stephen, which was used as a basis for the 2004 television film Hawking about his early years as a PhD student at the University of Cambridge and the beginnings of their relationship and marriage. She and Stephen Hawking established a working relationship following his separation and divorce from his second wife.

In 2009, an updated version of the autobiography was republished under the title Travelling to Infinity: My Life with Stephen and was subsequently made into the award-winning film The Theory of Everything. Following the release of the film, she discussed her life on BBC Radio 4's Woman's Hour in January 2015.

== Portrayal in media ==
Hawking was portrayed on television by Lisa Dillon in the 2004 television film Hawking, and on film by Felicity Jones in the 2014 film The Theory of Everything, for which Jones was nominated for the Academy Award for Best Actress.

== Works ==
=== Non-Fiction ===
- At Home In France: Guide to Buying and Renovating Property In France Allegro Publications 1994 ISBN 0952308002
- Music to Move the Stars: A Life with Stephen Macmillan Publishers, London 1999 ISBN 0-333-74686-4
- Travelling to Infinity: My Life with Stephen Alma Books 2007 ISBN 1-84688-065-3

=== Immortal Souls Novel Trilogy ===
1. Cry to Dream Again Alma Books 2018 ISBN 9781846884375
2. The Fiery Pillars of War Alma Books 2025 ISBN 9781846884733
3. Silent Music Alma Books 2016 ISBN 9781846884122
