= Wendy Neuss =

American television and film producer (born 1954)

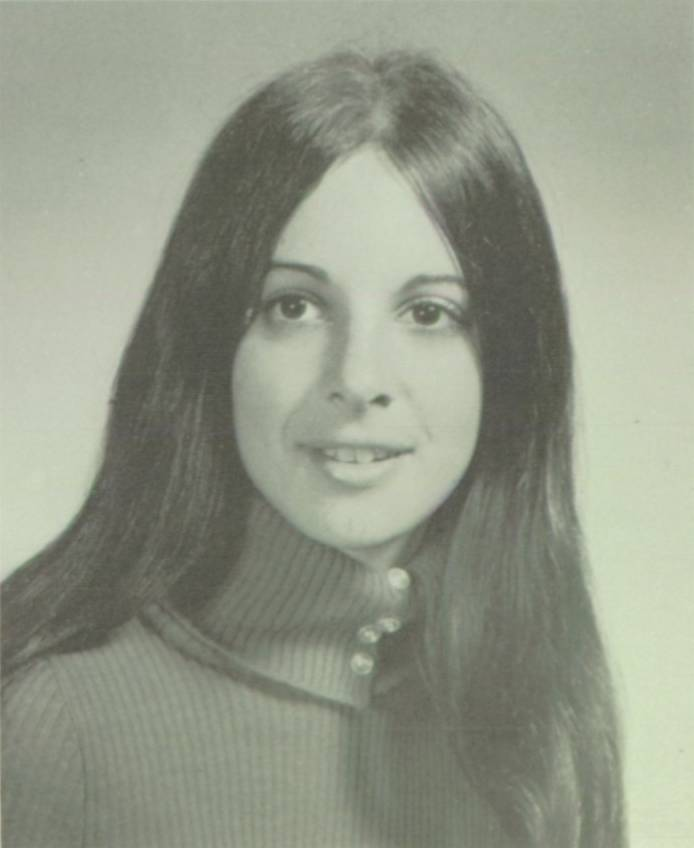
- Neuss in 1972
- Born: October 24, 1954 (age 72)
- Education: University of Pennsylvania
- Occupations: Television and film producer
- Years active: 1984–present
- Television: Star Trek: The Next Generation, Star Trek: Voyager
- Spouse: Patrick Stewart (m. 2000; div. 2003)

Wendy Neuss (born October 24, 1954) is an American television and film producer.

== Biography ==
Neuss was born in Livingston, New Jersey, USA, and graduated from the University of Pennsylvania in 1976 with a bachelor's degree in psychology.

Neuss was the executive producer of several TV films starring Patrick Stewart — to whom she was married until their divorce in 2003 after three years — including A Christmas Carol, The Lion in Winter and King of Texas. She produced these films as the president of Flying Freehold Productions, a company she co-founded with Stewart. She was co-producer on Star Trek: The Next Generation and a producer for the series Star Trek: Voyager. She has also produced the Motown series on the Showtime channel.
