= Lisa Dillon =

English actress (born 1979)

- Born: Lisa Stawiarski; 1979 (age 46–47); Coventry, West Midlands, England
- Education: Royal Academy of Dramatic Art (BA, Hons)
- Occupation: Actress
- Years active: 2003–present
- Awards: 2003 Critics' Circle Award for Most Promising Newcomer (known as the 'Jack Tinker Award') for The Master Builder and Iphigenia; 2003 First Prize in the Ian Charleson Awards for The Master Builder

Lisa Dillon (née Stawiarski; born 1979) is an English actress. Dillon has a long career in theatre playing many roles on stage. In television, she is best known for her role as Mary Smith in the BBC One television series Cranford. She also starred in the 2003 drama Cambridge Spies and the 2004 TV film Hawking. Dillon's film credits include the 2003 film Bright Young Things. In 2008, Dillon also duetted on Tim Arnold's song "She's Made a Gentleman of Me". In 2003, she won First Prize in the Ian Charleson Awards for theatre.

== Early life ==
Dillon attended Bournemouth School for Girls and left in 1997. She began a degree in English literature and drama at Royal Holloway, University of London but abandoned it when she won a place at the Royal Academy of Dramatic Art (RADA) from which she graduated with a BA in Acting with Honours in 2002.

== Career ==
=== Theatre ===
Whilst training at RADA, Dillon appeared in several productions staged there, including: Hamlet and The Tempest by William Shakespeare, The Devils by John Whiting, The Devil's Law Case by John Webster, Yentl by Leah Napolin and Isaac Bashevis Singer, and The Playboy of the Western World by J. M. Synge. Her first theatrical job after graduation was the title role in Euripides' Iphigeneia at Aulis at the Crucible Theatre, Sheffield.

She then went on to appear in numerous theatre productions, including as Hilda Wangel in The Master Builder by Henrik Ibsen at the Albery Theatre, (now the Noël Coward Theatre) London. Desdemona in Othello (with the RSC at the Trafalgar Studios, London, before embarking on an international tour). Ibsen's Hedda Gabler as Thea (Almeida Theatre, London, later transferring to the Duke of York's Theatre, London) and Period of Adjustment by Tennessee Williams (The Swan Theatre, Stratford-upon-Avon later transferring to the Almeida Theatre, London.)

In 2007, she returned to the Crucible to play Celia in Shakespeare's As You Like It during February (in a production that also played at the RSC complete works festival) and Varya in Chekhov's The Cherry Orchard during March. She then starred in the National Theatre's revival of Noël Coward's Present Laughter and The Hour We Knew Nothing of Each Other. She also appeared in Anna Mackmin's 2008 West End revival of Under the Blue Sky by David Eldridge.

In 2009, Dillon starred in When the Rain Stops Falling at the Almeida, and in 2010 in Design for Living and its successor production A Flea In Her Ear at the Old Vic. Eldridge created the role of Lucy in The Knot of the Heart, presented at the Almeida in March 2011, specifically for Dillon. In early 2012, Dillon played the role of Katharina in the Royal Shakespeare Company (RSC) Stratford and touring production of The Taming of the Shrew. In 2013, she starred with Joel Samuels and William Troughton in Happy New (written by Brendan Cowell) and performed in London's West End.

In 2014, she starred as Moll Cutpurse in The Roaring Girl with the RSC. In December 2015 she took the title role in Hapgood for director Howard Davies at the Hampstead Theatre.

=== Television ===
Dillon is now best known for her role as Mary Smith in the British television series Cranford on BBC One where she starred alongside Eileen Atkins, Michael Gambon, Imelda Staunton, Jim Carter and Judi Dench. She also starred in the 2003 drama Cambridge Spies and the 2004 TV film, Hawking, both of which were also for the BBC. She appeared in The Jury on ITV in autumn 2011, appeared as Melinda in the third episode of Dirk Gently for BBC Four in March 2012, and appeared as Deirdre Denning in the Midsomer Murders episode "Murder of Innocence", also in March 2012. In 2015 she appeared as Carla Gillespie in the 2015 ITV three-part detective thriller Black Work. She portrayed Barbara Haleton in four episodes of the 2016 broadcast of Stan Lee's Lucky Man, the most successful Sky One original drama series to that date. In 2025, she appeared as Clare Rewcastle Brown in The Hack television series on ITVX.

=== Film ===
Dillon's film credits include the Stephen Fry directed 2003 film Bright Young Things. She appeared as Mrs Drayton in the 2015 historical drama Suffragette. In 2025, Dillon appeared in Downton Abbey: The Grand Finale as Princess Arthur of Connaught.

=== Music ===
In 2008 Dillon duetted with British singer-songwriter Tim Arnold on his song "She's Made A Gentleman Of Me".

=== Radio ===
In 2011 Dillon read a Jarvis and Ayres production of Hilda Richards' 1939 story "Jemima Gets Them Guessing" for BBC Radio 4's Afternoon Reading show, on 9 March.

She has undertaken the following roles in productions by Jarvis and Ayres for BBC Radio 4 of: Honey Ryder in "Dr. No" on 24 May 2008, Tilly Masterson in "Goldfinger" on 3 April 2010, Tracy Draco in "On Her Majesty's Secret Service" on 3 May 2014, Tiffany Case in "Diamonds are Forever"" on 25 July 2015, and Patricia Fearing in "Thunderball" on 10 December 2016.

=== Awards ===
In 2003, Dillon was nominated for one, and won two, awards. She was nominated for the Evening Standard Award for Outstanding Newcomer of the Year for the performance she gave in a production of Ibsen's The Master Builder. She won First Prize in the Ian Charleson Awards, also for that performance, and won the Critics' Circle Award for Most Promising Newcomer (known as the 'Jack Tinker Award') for that performance as well as for her performance in Iphigenia.

== Personal life ==
From 2003 to 2007, Dillon was in a relationship with Patrick Stewart. She initially met Stewart when she was 23 years old and he was 62 and married to Wendy Neuss. Dillon felt Stewart diminished their relationship, and did not honour her properly, in his memoir Making It So: A Memoir.
