= Patrick Stewart =

English actor (1940–2026)

Sir Patrick Stewart OBE
- Stewart in 1999
- Born: 13 July 1940; Mirfield, West Riding of Yorkshire, England
- Died: 28 October 2026 (aged 86); Los Angeles, California, US
- Education: Bristol Old Vic Theatre School
- Occupation: Actor
- Years active: 1959–2026
- Works: Full list
- Spouses: Sheila Falconer (m. 1966; div. 1990); Wendy Neuss (m. 2000; div. 2003); Sunny Ozell (m. 2013)
- Children: 2
- Awards: Full list

Sir Patrick Stewart (13 July 1940 – 28 October 2026) was an English actor. With a career spanning over 60 years on stage and screen, he received numerous accolades, including three Laurence Olivier Awards and a Grammy Award, as well as nominations for a Tony Award, three Golden Globe Awards, four Emmy Awards, and three Screen Actors Guild Awards. He was knighted by Queen Elizabeth II for his services to drama in 2010.

Stewart became a member of the Royal Shakespeare Company (RSC) in 1966 and later acted in several productions with the Royal National Theatre. On the West End stage, he earned two Laurence Olivier Awards for Best Actor in a Supporting Role for playing Enobarbus in Antony and Cleopatra (1979) and King Claudius in Hamlet (2009). He made his Broadway debut in A Midsummer Night's Dream (1971). He later played the title role in Macbeth (2008), earning a nomination for the Tony Award for Best Actor in a Play. Stewart also acted alongside Ian McKellen in multiple plays, including repertory productions of Waiting for Godot and No Man's Land, which they performed on the West End and on Broadway.

He gained international stardom for his portrayal of Captain Jean-Luc Picard in the sci-fi series Star Trek: The Next Generation (1987–1994), a role he reprised in a series of four films (1994–2002) and Star Trek: Picard (2020–2023). He acted in the television projects Fall of Eagles (1974); I, Claudius (1976); Tinker Tailor Soldier Spy (1979); Moby Dick (1998); A Christmas Carol (1999); and The Lion in Winter (2003). He also took guest roles in the sitcoms Frasier (2003) and Extras (2005) and collaborated with Seth MacFarlane, voicing CIA Deputy Director Avery Bullock in the animated sitcom American Dad! (2005–2026), narrating the two Ted films (2012, 2015), and starring in the Starz sitcom Blunt Talk (2015–2016).

In film, Stewart gained further stardom portraying Professor Charles Xavier in the X-Men film series (2000–2017), reprising the role in the Marvel Cinematic Universe (2022–2026), with Avengers: Doomsday being his final film performance. He also acted in Hedda (1975), Excalibur (1981), Dune (1984), Robin Hood: Men in Tights (1993), Jeffrey (1995), Match (2014), Green Room (2015), and The Kid Who Would Be King (2019), with voice roles in The Pagemaster (1994), The Prince of Egypt (1998), Jimmy Neutron: Boy Genius (2001), and The Sheep Detectives (2026).

== Early life and education ==
Patrick Stewart was born on 13 July 1940 in Mirfield, then in the West Riding of Yorkshire, England. His parents were Gladys (née Barrowclough), a weaver and textile worker, and Alfred Stewart, who served in the British Army during the Second World War and took part in the Dunkirk evacuation. He became a regimental sergeant major in the 2nd Parachute Brigade, serving in Operation Rugby in the south of France and Operation Manna in Greece. After the war, Alfred worked as a general labourer and postman, and suffered from combat fatigue.

Stewart had two older brothers, Geoffrey and Trevor. He spent much of his childhood in a poor household in Mirfield, where he experienced domestic violence at the hands of his father, which may have been a result of his wartime PTSD. Stewart said in 2008, "My father was a very potent individual, a very powerful man, who got what he wanted. It was said that when he strode onto the parade ground, birds stopped singing. It was many, many years before I realised how my father inserted himself into my work. I've grown a moustache for Macbeth. My father didn't have one, but when I looked in the mirror just before I went on stage I saw my father's face staring straight back at me."

Stewart attended Crowlees Junior and Infants School, a Church of England–affiliated school in Mirfield. He later attributed his acting career to his English teacher there, Cecil Dormand, who "put a copy of Shakespeare in [Stewart's] hand" and told him to get up and perform. He entered Mirfield Secondary Modern School in 1951, aged 11, and continued to study drama there. Around the same time, he met and befriended fellow actor Brian Blessed during a drama course in Mytholmroyd. At the age of 15, he left school and increased his participation in local theatre. He supported himself by working as a newspaper reporter and obituary writer for a local newspaper, but left after one year when his boss gave him an ultimatum to choose acting or journalism. According to one of his brothers, Stewart would attend theatre rehearsals when he was supposed to be at work and then invent the stories he was reporting or persuade other reporters to cover for him. Stewart gained employment in a furniture store, which allowed him to attend rehearsals with few scheduling conflicts. He found that his thespian talent was applicable to the job, resulting in him becoming a productive salesman while practising his acting technique by tailoring his pitch for each customer. He also trained in boxing. He said that acting served as a means of self-expression in his youth. Stewart and Blessed later received grants to attend the Bristol Old Vic Theatre School. Stewart was the first person who was neither a graduate of Oxford nor Cambridge to receive a grant from West Riding Council.

== Career ==
=== 1959–1986: Early acting roles ===
Stewart as a member of the Royal Shakespeare Company, 1976

Stewart's first professional stage appearance was on 19 May 1959 at the Theatre Royal, Bristol (for the Bristol Old Vic Company), playing Cutpurse (a thief among the audience for the play-within-a-play) in Cyrano de Bergerac, directed by John Hale. Following a period with Manchester's Library Theatre, Stewart became a member of the Royal Shakespeare Company in 1966, remaining with them until 1982. He became an associate artist of the company in 1967. He appeared with actors such as Ben Kingsley and Ian Richardson. In January 1967, he made his debut TV appearance on Coronation Street as a fire officer. In 1969, he had a brief TV cameo role as Horatio, opposite Ian Richardson's Hamlet, in a performance of the gravedigger scene as part of episode six of Sir Kenneth Clark's Civilisation television series. During the early 1970s, University of California, Santa Barbara (UCSB) professor Homer Swander recruited him to help teach US university students about Shakespeare, which led to his breakthrough into Hollywood. He made his Broadway debut as Tom Snout in Peter Brook's 1970 production of A Midsummer Night's Dream, then moved to the Royal National Theatre in the early 1980s. Stewart was a prolific actor in performances by the Royal Shakespeare Company, appearing in more than 60 productions. His first appearance was in 1966 in The Investigation, and in the years that followed he became a core member of the company, taking on three or four major roles each season.

Over the years, Stewart took roles in many major television series without ever becoming a household name. He appeared as Vladimir Lenin in Fall of Eagles; Sejanus in I, Claudius; Karla in Tinker Tailor Soldier Spy and Smiley's People; and Claudius in a 1980 BBC adaptation of Hamlet. He took the romantic male lead in the 1975 BBC adaptation of Elizabeth Gaskell's North and South. He also took the lead, as psychiatric consultant Dr Edward Roebuck, in BBC's Maybury in 1981. He continued to play minor roles in films, such as Ejlert Løvborg in Hedda (1975), King Leondegrance in John Boorman's Excalibur (1981), the character Gurney Halleck in David Lynch's Dune (1984), Dr. Armstrong in Tobe Hooper's Lifeforce (1985), and Henry Grey in Lady Jane (1986), the story of English Queen Lady Jane Grey.

Stewart preferred classical theatre to other genres, asking Doctor Who actress Lalla Ward why she would work in science fiction or on television. In 1987, he nonetheless agreed to work in Hollywood on a revival of Star Trek, after Robert H. Justman saw him while attending a literary reading at UCLA. Stewart knew nothing about the cultural influence of Star Trek or its iconic status in American culture. He was reluctant to sign the standard contract of six years, but did so as he, his agent, and others with whom Stewart consulted all believed the new show would quickly fail, allowing him to return to his London stage career after making some money. Regardless, Stewart's trusted colleague, Ian McKellen, was particularly vocal in advising Stewart not to throw away his theatrical career for this foray into television, which Stewart had to disregard considering the opportunity. While in Hollywood, he spent 18 months using the professional name "Patrick Hewes Stewart" while negotiating the rights to his original name from an American actor who had already registered it with the Screen Actors Guild.

=== 1987–1999: Stardom with Star Trek and Shakespeare ===
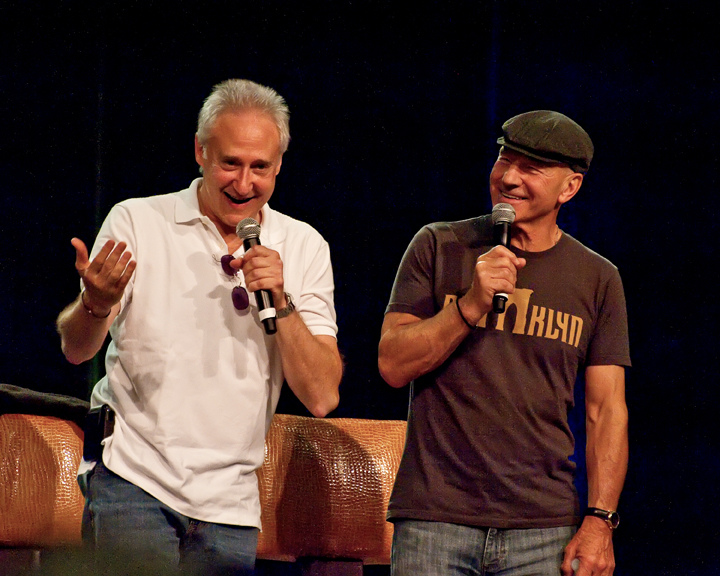
Stewart with Brent Spiner in 2010

When Stewart was picked for the role of Captain Jean-Luc Picard in Star Trek: The Next Generation (1987–1994), the Los Angeles Times called him an "unknown British Shakespearean actor". Still living out of his suitcase because of his scepticism that the show would succeed, he was unprepared for the long schedule of television production that began at 4:45 am each day. He initially experienced difficulty fitting in with his less-disciplined castmates. In interviews, he recalled with embarrassment a time when he scolded the main cast for being unprofessional in his opinion, by saying, "We're not here ... to have fun!" Furthermore, Stewart stated that his "spirits used to sink" whenever he was required to memorise and recite technobabble. He eventually came to better understand the cultural differences between the stage and television and relaxed to a degree at work, and his favourite technical phrase became "spacetime continuum". His respect for the genre and work grew to the point that he walked off the set when he discovered that Good Morning America was to film a promotional segment that he saw as belittling the series. He would later write that the role of Picard reminded him of his Shakespearean roles, stating, "I should play Jean-Luc, I realised, as if he were a character in Henry IV, which is about brave men".

Stewart remained close friends with his fellow Star Trek actors and became their advocate with the producers when necessary. Marina Sirtis credited Stewart with "at least 50%, if not more" of the show's success because others imitated his professionalism and dedication to acting. Jonathan Frakes said that, with some shows he had been on, there were actors who showed up without having read the script, but Stewart had "set such a high bar for preparation. We all came to work in the morning completely prepared. We knew our lines and had broken down the script".

It really wasn't until the first season ended [when] I went to my first Star Trek convention ... [I] had expected that I would be standing in front of a few hundred people and found that there were two and a half thousand people and that they already knew more about me than I could ever possibly have believed.

— Stewart, on when he realised he had become famous

Stewart unexpectedly became wealthy because of the show's success. In 1992, during a break in filming, Stewart calculated that he earned more during that break than from ten weeks of Who's Afraid of Virginia Woolf? in London. He also portrayed Picard in Star Trek: Deep Space Nine's 1993 pilot episode "Emissary" and in the films Star Trek Generations (1994), Star Trek: First Contact (1996), Star Trek: Insurrection (1998), and Star Trek: Nemesis (2002). In 1995, he received a Screen Actors Guild Award nomination for Outstanding Performance by a Male Actor in a Drama Series.

After The Next Generation began, Stewart soon found that he missed acting on the stage. Although he remained associated with the Royal Shakespeare Company, the lengthy filming for the series had prevented him from participating in most other works, leaving a "gaping hole" of many years in his CV as a Shakespearean actor, causing him to miss opportunities to play such notable roles as Hamlet, Romeo, and Richard III. Instead, Stewart began writing one-man shows that he performed in California universities and acting schools. One of these—a version of Charles Dickens's A Christmas Carol in which he portrayed all 40-plus characters—became ideal for him as an actor as well, because of its limited performing schedule. In 1991, Stewart performed A Christmas Carol on Broadway, receiving a nomination for that year's Drama Desk Award for Outstanding One-Person Show. He staged encore Broadway performances in 1992 and 1994, with the 1993 run held in London and the 1996 production in Los Angeles. Stewart brought the show back to Broadway in 2001, with all proceeds going to charity; the revenue from 28 December performance specifically went to 11 September campaign of the Actors Fund of America. A 23-day run re-opened in London's West End in December 2005. For his performances in this play, Stewart received the Drama Desk Award for Best Solo Performance in 1992 and the Laurence Olivier Award for Best Entertainment for Solo Performance in 1994. He was also the co-producer of the show, through the company he set up for the purpose: Camm Lane Productions, a reference to his birthplace in Camm Lane, Mirfield.

Stewart's other film and television roles included King Richard in Robin Hood: Men in Tights (1993), the flamboyantly gay Sterling in the 1995 film Jeffrey (1995) and Captain Ahab in the 1998 made-for-television film version of Moby Dick, receiving an Emmy Award nomination and a Golden Globe Award nomination for his performance. He also starred as Scrooge in a 1999 television film version of Charles Dickens's A Christmas Carol, receiving a Screen Actors Guild Award nomination for his performance.

Known for his strong and authoritative voice, Stewart lent his voice to a number of projects during this period. He was a voice actor in the animated films The Pagemaster (1994) and The Prince of Egypt (1998). He supported his home town of Dewsbury in West Yorkshire by lending his voice to a series of videos on the town in 1999. He voiced the pig Napoleon in a made-for-TV film adaptation of George Orwell's Animal Farm and guest-starred in The Simpsons episode "Homer the Great" as Number One. Stewart also recorded a narration planned for the prologue and epilogue for Tim Burton's The Nightmare Before Christmas, but the final movie used another voice (the original narration appears only on the first edition of the film's soundtrack). He narrated recordings of Prokofiev's Peter and the Wolf (winning a Grammy), Vivaldi's The Four Seasons (which had also been narrated by William Shatner), C. S. Lewis's The Last Battle (the conclusion of the series The Chronicles of Narnia), and Rick Wakeman's Return to the Centre of the Earth; as well as numerous TV programmes such as High Spirits with Shirley Ghostman. Stewart provided the narration for Nine Worlds, an astronomical tour of the Solar System and nature documentaries such as The Secret of Life on Earth. He is heard as the voice of the Magic Mirror in Disneyland's live show, Snow White – An Enchanting Musical. He narrated two fulldome video shows MarsQuest and The Voyager Encounters. His voice talents also appeared in a number of commercials, including the UK TV adverts for the relaunch of TSB Bank, Domestos bleach, Moneysupermarket.com, an advertisement for Shell fuel, and a US advertisement for the prescription drug Crestor.

His Shakespeare roles during this period included Prospero in Shakespeare's The Tempest, first at the Delacorte Theater in Central Park as part of Shakespeare in the Park and then on Broadway in 1995, a role he would reprise in Rupert Goold's 2006 production of The Tempest as part of the Royal Shakespeare Company's Complete Works Festival. In 1997, he took the role of Othello with the Shakespeare Theatre Company (Washington, D.C.) in a "photo negative" production of a white Othello with an otherwise all-black cast. Stewart had wanted to play the title role since the age of 14, so he and director Jude Kelly inverted the play so Othello became a comment on a white man entering a black society. As part of this RSC tour, Stewart travelled to Ann Arbor, Michigan, for a major university residency, starring in both productions as Prospero in The Tempest and Mark Antony in Antony and Cleopatra.

"It came to a point where I had no idea where Picard began and I ended. We completely overlapped. His voice became my voice, and there were other elements of him that became me" ... No director in Hollywood wanted to cast this grand, deep-voiced, bald English guy because everybody knew he was Picard and couldn't possibly be anybody else. In the event, he effectively reprised the part as Professor Charles Xavier – a grand, deep-voiced, bald English guy – in the X-Men films.

— Interview, The Times

When asked in 2011 for the highlight of his career, he chose Star Trek: The Next Generation, because "it changed everything [for me]." He also said he was very proud of his work on Star Trek: The Next Generation for its social messages and educational impact on young viewers. When questioned about his role's significance compared to his distinguished Shakespearean career, he said, "The fact is all of those years in Royal Shakespeare Company—playing all those kings, emperors, princes and tragic heroes—were nothing but preparation for sitting in the captain's chair of the Enterprise." The accolades he received include the readers of TV Guide in 1992 choosing him with Cindy Crawford, of whom he had never heard, as television's "most bodacious" man and woman. In an interview with Michael Parkinson, he expressed gratitude for Gene Roddenberry's response to a reporter who said, "Surely they would have cured baldness by the 24th century", to which Roddenberry replied, "In the 24th century, they wouldn't care."

The success of the Star Trek: The Next Generation TV and film franchises typecast Stewart as Picard, and obtaining other roles became difficult. He also found returning to the stage difficult because of his long absence. He commented that he would never have joined The Next Generation had he known that it would air for seven years: "No, no. NO. And looking back now it still frightens me a little bit to think that so much of my life was totally devoted to Star Trek and almost nothing else."

=== 2000–2010: X-Men film series and Macbeth on Broadway ===
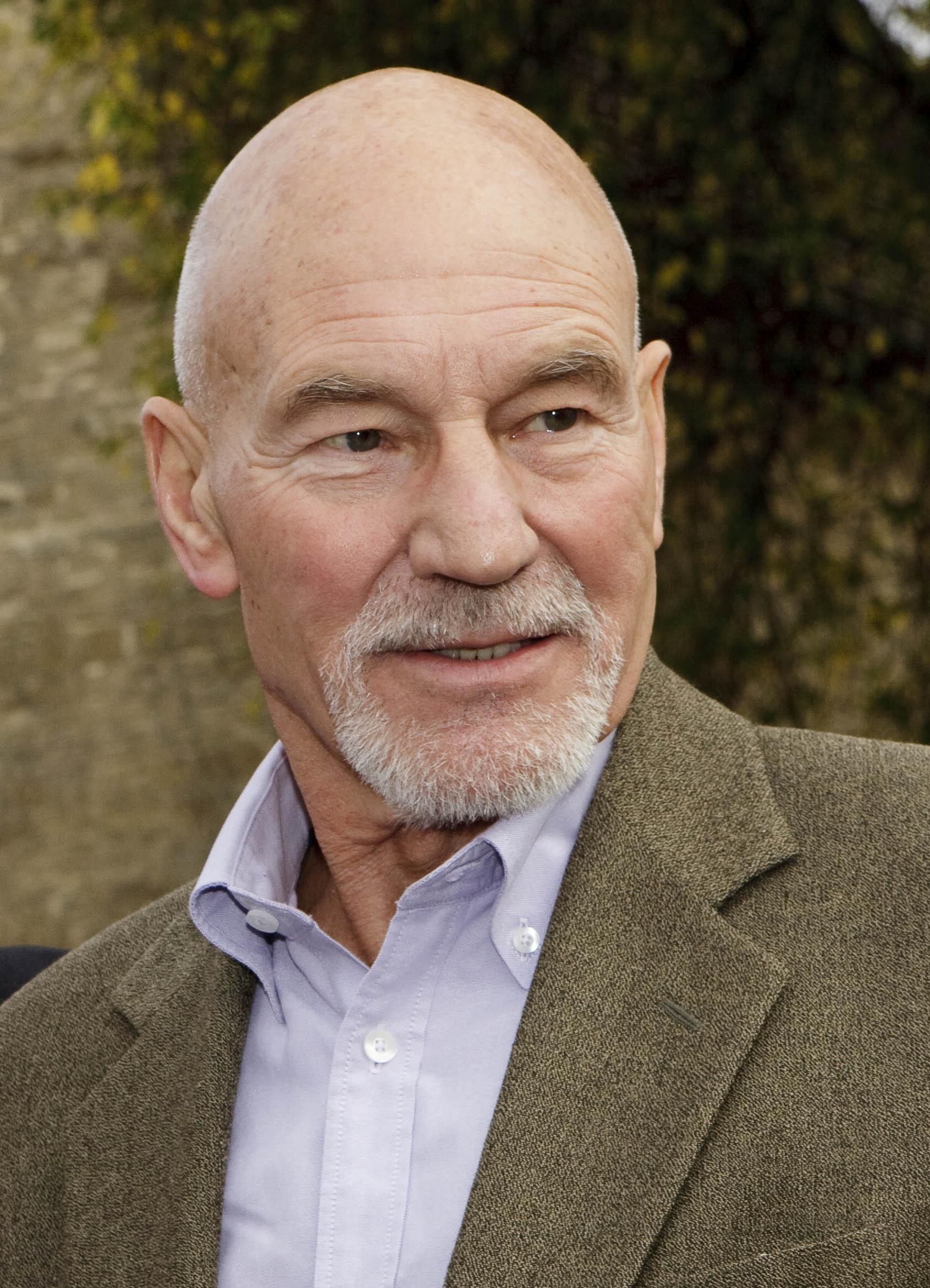
Stewart in 2009

However, in the late 1990s, Stewart accepted a key role in the big-budget X-Men film series as Professor Charles Xavier, founder and mentor of the superhero team—a role similar in many ways to Picard. He was initially reluctant to sign on to another movie franchise, but his interest in working with director Bryan Singer persuaded him. In addition, Stewart was joined by Ian McKellen, who had by then conceded that his friend had made a prudent choice performing in popular screen science fiction; McKellen played Xavier's friend and ideological nemesis, the supervillain Magneto. Stewart played the role in nine feature films (X-Men, X2, X-Men: The Last Stand, X-Men Origins: Wolverine, The Wolverine, X-Men: Days of Future Past, Logan, Doctor Strange in the Multiverse of Madness, and Avengers: Doomsday) and voiced the role in several video games (X-Men Legends, X-Men Legends II, and X-Men: Next Dimension).

In late 2003, during the 11th and final season of NBC's Frasier, Stewart appeared on the show as a gay Seattle socialite and opera director, who mistakes Frasier for a potential lover. In July 2003, he appeared in series 2, episode 9 of Top Gear in the Star in a Reasonably-Priced Car segment, achieving a time of 1:50 in the Liana. He starred as King Henry II in The Lion in Winter (2003), for which he received a Golden Globe Award nomination for his performance and an Emmy Award nomination for executive producing the film. In 2005, he was cast as Professor Ian Hood in an ITV thriller 4-episode series Eleventh Hour, created by Stephen Gallagher. The first episode was broadcast on 19 January 2006. In 2005, he also played Captain Nemo in a two-part adaptation of The Mysterious Island. Stewart also appeared as a nudity-obsessed caricature of himself in Ricky Gervais and Stephen Merchant's television series Extras.

Stewart lent his voice to the animated films Jimmy Neutron: Boy Genius (2001), Chicken Little (2005), and the English dubbings of the Japanese anime films Nausicaä of the Valley of the Wind, by Hayao Miyazaki, and Steamboy, by Katsuhiro Otomo. He played a recurring role as CIA Deputy Director Avery Bullock, lending his likeness as well as his voice to the animated series American Dad!. He also made several guest appearances on Family Guy in various roles. In 2006, Stewart voiced Bambi's father, the Great Prince of the Forest, in Disney's direct-to-video sequel Bambi II. He lent his voice to the Activision-produced Star Trek computer games Star Trek: Armada, Armada II, Star Trek: Starfleet Command III, Star Trek: Invasion, Bridge Commander, and Elite Force II, all reprising his role as Picard. Stewart reprised his role as Picard in Star Trek: Legacy for both PC and Xbox 360, along with the four other major Starfleet captains from the different Star Trek series. In addition to voicing his characters from Star Trek and X-Men in several related computer and video games, Stewart worked as a voice actor on games unrelated to both franchises, such as Castlevania: Lords of Shadow, Forgotten Realms: Demon Stone, Lands of Lore: The Throne of Chaos and The Elder Scrolls IV: Oblivion, for which in 2006 he won a Spike TV Video Game Award for his work as Emperor Uriel Septim. He also voiced the UK and Australian TV advertisements for the PAL version of Final Fantasy XII. Stewart provided the voice of Max Winters in TMNT in March 2007.

[London theatre] critics ... have showered him with perhaps the highest compliment they can conjure. He has, they say, overcome the technique-destroying indignity of being a major American television star.

— The New York Times, 2008

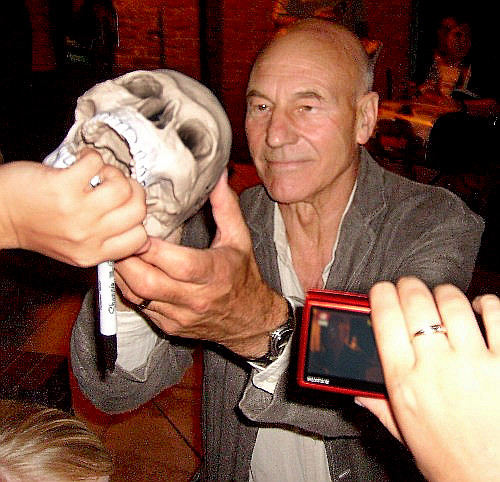
Stewart signing autographs following a production of Hamlet at the RSC in July 2008

He played Antony again opposite Harriet Walter's Cleopatra in Antony and Cleopatra at the Novello Theatre in London in 2007 to excellent reviews. During this period, Stewart also addressed the Durham Union Society on his life in film and theatre. When Stewart began playing Macbeth in the West End in 2007, some said that he (aged 67 at the time) was too old for the role for a character; nevertheless, he and the show again received excellent reviews, with one critic calling Stewart "one of our finest Shakespearean actors". He reprised the role on Broadway in 2008. He was named as the next Cameron Mackintosh Visiting Professor of Contemporary Theatre based at St Catherine's College, Oxford, in January 2007. In 2008, Stewart played King Claudius in Hamlet alongside David Tennant. He won the Laurence Olivier Award for Best Supporting Actor for the part. When collecting his award, he dedicated the award "in part" to Tennant and Tennant's understudy Edward Bennett, after Tennant's back injury and subsequent absence from four weeks of Hamlet disqualified him from an Olivier nomination.

In 2009, Stewart appeared alongside Ian McKellen as the lead duo of Vladimir (Didi) and Estragon (Gogo), in Waiting for Godot. Stewart had previously appeared only once alongside McKellen on stage, but the pair had developed a close friendship while waiting around on set filming the X-Men films. Stewart stated that performing in this play was the fulfilment of a 50-year ambition, having seen Peter O'Toole appear in it at the Bristol Old Vic when Stewart was just 17. Reviewers stated that his interpretation captured well the balance between humour and despair that characterises the work.

=== 2010–2016: Return to the stage and voice roles ===
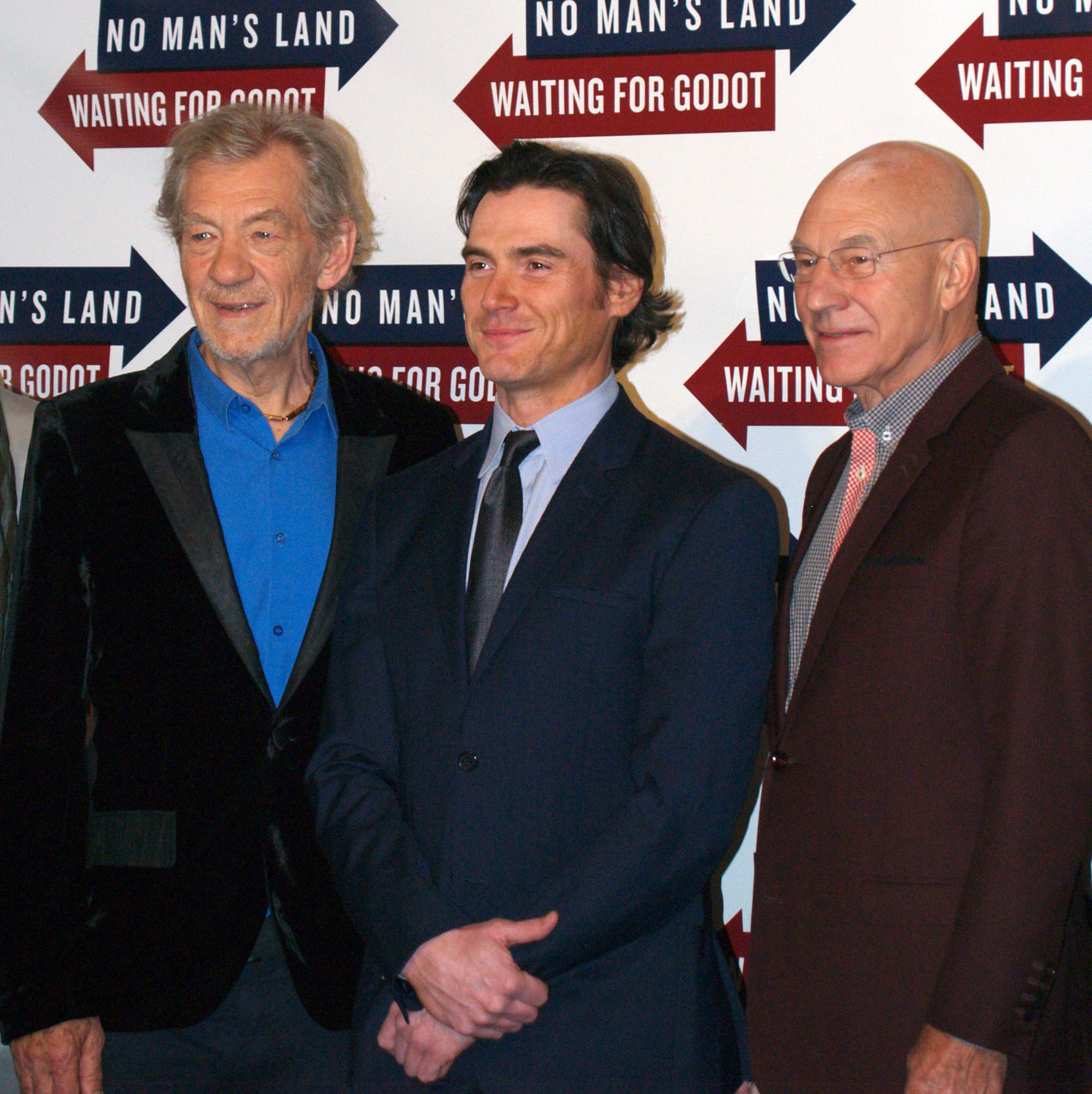
Stewart with actors Ian McKellen and Billy Crudup at a September 2013 press event at Sardi's restaurant for Waiting for Godot and No Man's Land

In 2011, Stewart appeared in the feature-length documentary The Captains alongside William Shatner, who played Star Trek Captain James Kirk, and who also wrote and directed the film. In the film, Shatner interviews actors who have portrayed captains within the Star Trek franchise. The film pays a great deal of attention to Shatner's interviews with Stewart at his home in Oxfordshire, as well as at a Star Trek Convention in Las Vegas, Nevada; Stewart reveals the fear and personal failings that came along with his tenure as a Starfleet captain, and also the great triumphs he believes accompanied his role as Picard. On 18 November 2012, Stewart appeared on stage at St Martin's Theatre in the West End for a 60th anniversary performance of Agatha Christie's The Mousetrap, the longest-running play in London and the world.

In 2014, Stewart starred in the drama film Match. That same year, Stewart and McKellen appeared on Broadway with two alternating productions, Waiting for Godot and No Man's Land. To promote the plays, Stewart and McKellen acted on Stewart's wife's suggestion to tour New York City in a Twitter campaign in which the actors would take playful photographs of themselves visiting various tourist locations on their days off while wearing their Godot characters' bowler hats. Although the plays' marketing department disapproved of the idea, the actors proceeded with the inexpensive publicity campaign, which proved a major success. Furthermore, this campaign changed Stewart's image as a serious actor by emphasising his sense of humour, which led to frequent guest appearances on various comedy programmes. He also hosted a gala at the 2015 Just for Laughs comedy festival in Montreal, where he famously delivered a self-deprecating mock eulogy for himself.

Stewart appeared in a villainous role in Green Room (2015). Roxana Hadadi of Vulture wrote that his performance "weaponizes all the paternal qualities he exhibited in his prior work and toxifies the principled leadership associated with his persona." Stewart starred in the Starz comedy Blunt Talk, created by Jonathan Ames and produced by Seth MacFarlane, which lasted two seasons from 2015 to 2016.

Stewart appeared as narrator in Seth MacFarlane's 2012 film directorial debut Ted and the 2015 sequel Ted 2, and lent his voice to the nature documentary Mountain Gorilla. He also voiced the narrator of the Electronic Arts computer game The Sims Medieval for the game's cinematic introduction and trailer released on 22 March 2011. He voiced the story plaques and trailer of the MMOG LEGO Universe and the narrator of My Memory of Us. In 2016, he narrated Connected Universe, a crowdfunded documentary film directed by Malcolm Carter on the ideas of self-styled physicist Nassim Haramein.

=== 2017–2026: Logan, Star Trek: Picard, and Marvel Cinematic Universe ===
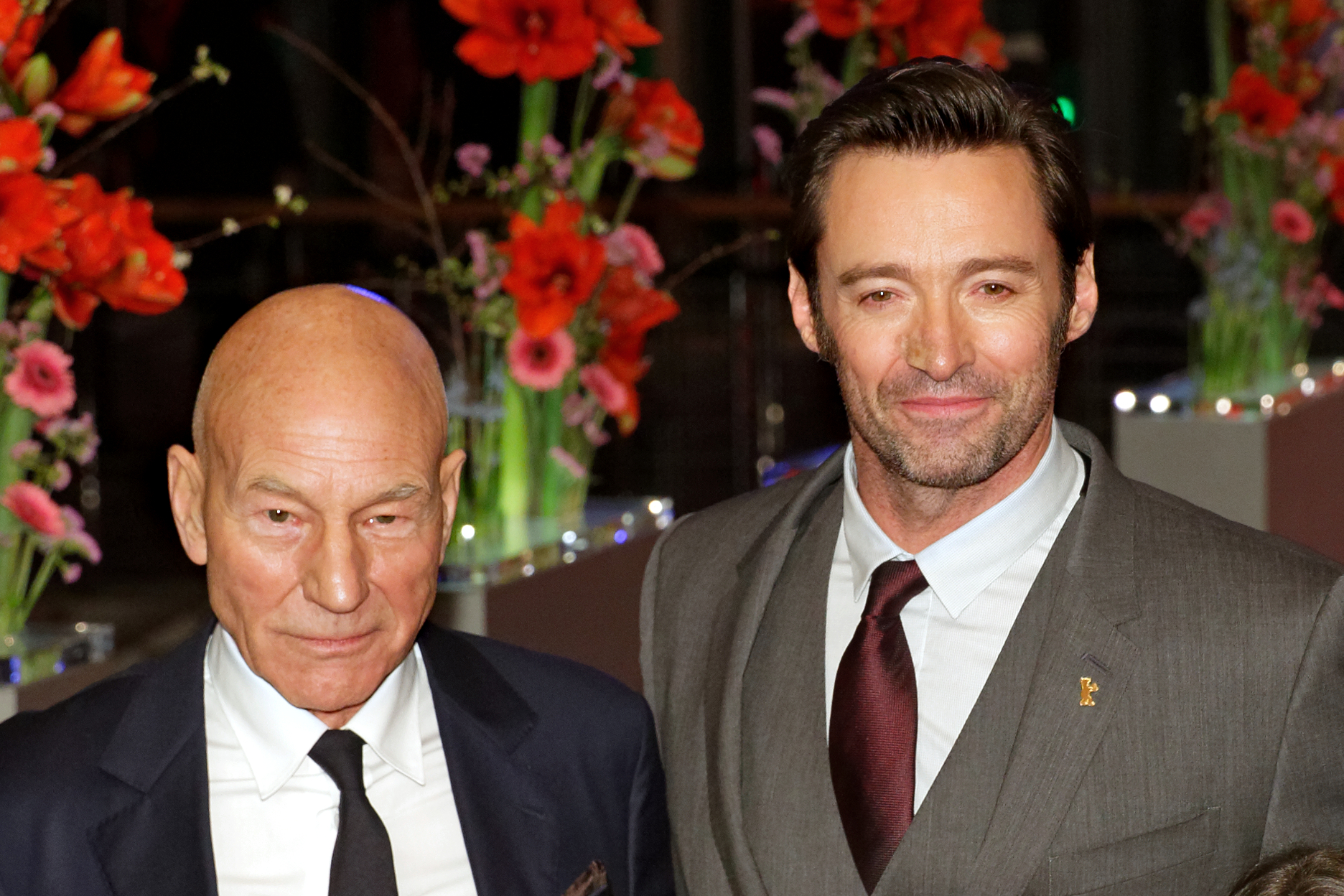
Stewart with co-star Hugh Jackman at the 2017 world premiere of Logan

Stewart returned to the role of Professor X in the James Mangold-directed Logan (2017). The film premiered at the 67th Berlin International Film Festival to critical acclaim with especially positive notices for Stewart's performance. Manohla Dargis of The New York Times wrote, "Mr. Stewart, using a rasp that suggests decay is working its way out from the inside, does some beautiful work, especially with Mr. Jackman" comparing his performance to that of King Lear. Sheri Linden of The Hollywood Reporter described him as "superb," adding, "Stewart is effortlessly compelling as a man whose attentiveness to the world around him runs deep, even as his own tethers to it are fraying." Stewart initially announced that he would be leaving the X-Men film franchise after Logan. He was nominated for the Critics' Choice Movie Award for Best Supporting Actor.

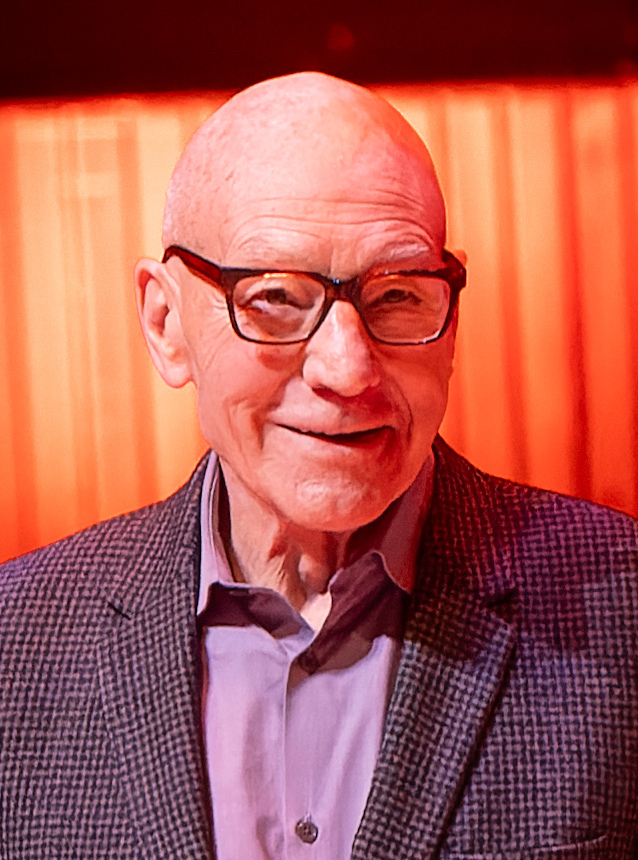
Stewart in 2023

On 4 August 2018, CBS and Stewart jointly announced that he would reprise his role as Jean-Luc Picard in a new Star Trek series. In a prepared statement, Stewart said he and the new show's producers would "endeavour to bring a fresh, unexpected and pertinent story to life once more." Star Trek: Picard aired three seasons from 2020 to 2023. In 2019, Stewart played the Adult Merlin in Joe Cornish's fantasy adventure film The Kid Who Would Be King, and John Bosley in the action comedy film Charlie's Angels, released on 15 November. He also gave voice performances in The Emoji Movie (2017) and Dragon Rider (2020).

In 2022, Stewart portrayed an alternate Xavier in the Marvel Cinematic Universe film Doctor Strange in the Multiverse of Madness. In 2026, he voiced an elderly Boreray Blackface ram, Sir Ritchfield, in the family mystery comedy-drama The Sheep Detectives, which was critically acclaimed. In 2025, it was announced he would reprise his role as the original Xavier in Avengers: Doomsday (2026), alongside McKellen's Magneto, in what proved to be his final film role.

== Acting credits and accolades ==
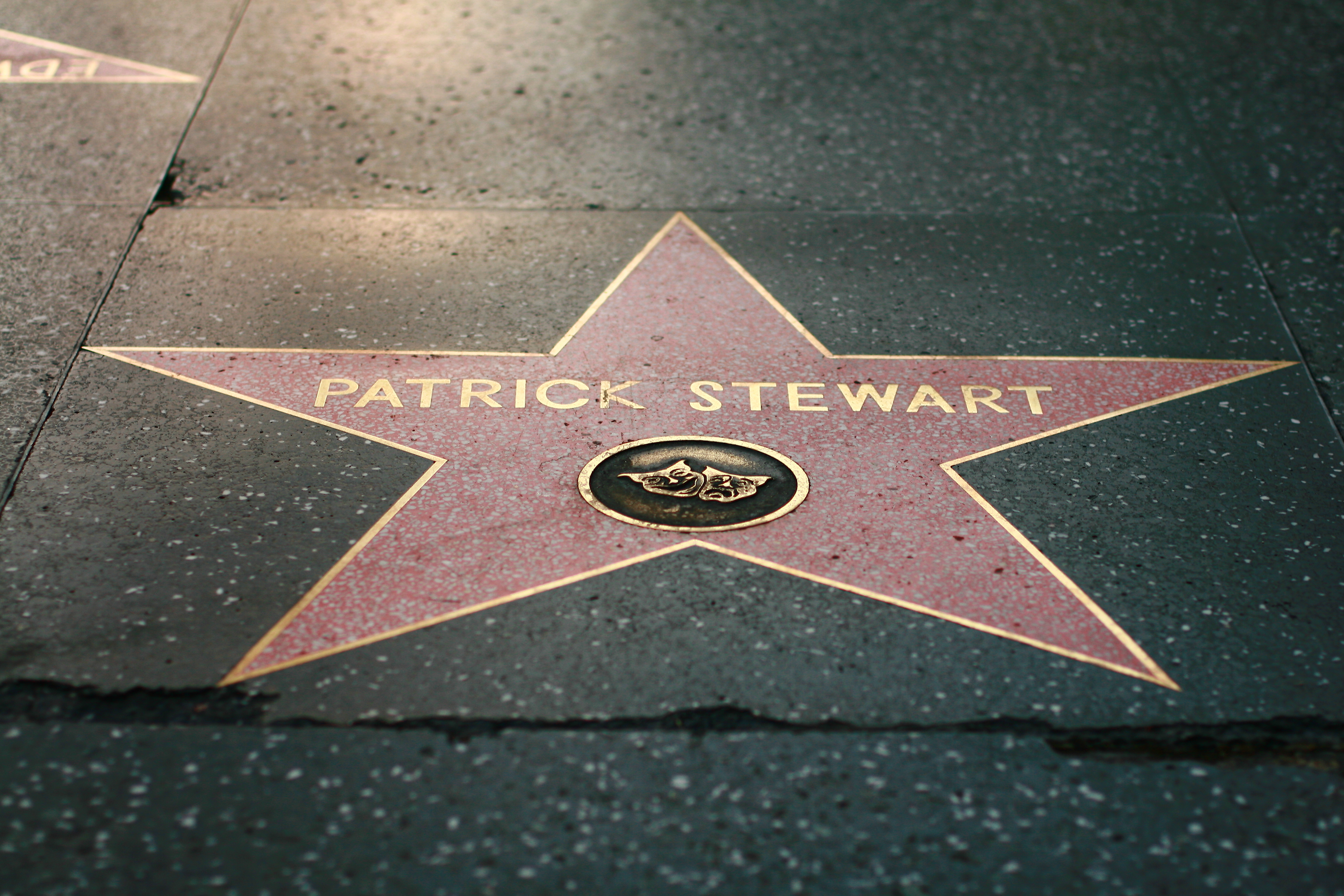
Stewart's star on the Hollywood Walk of Fame

Stewart, who was a member of the Royal Shakespeare Company from 1966 to 1982, was an Honorary Associate Artist of the company, a designation typically awarded after an actor's principal period with the RSC.

TV Guide named him the Best Dramatic Television Actor of the 1980s in 1993. In 1995 Stewart was a commencement speaker at Pomona College, where he received an honorary Doctorate of Letters. On 16 December 1996, Stewart received a star on the Hollywood Walk of Fame at 7021 Hollywood Boulevard. Stewart was appointed an Officer of the Order of the British Empire (OBE) in the 2001 New Year Honours for services to acting and the cinema. He also received an honorary fellowship from the University of Wales, Cardiff, in July 2001.

In 2004, Stewart was appointed chancellor of the University of Huddersfield, and in July 2008 he became a professor of performing arts. During this period, he regularly attended graduation ceremonies in the UK and Hong Kong and taught master classes for drama students. He stepped down from the chancellorship in July 2015 and was named chancellor emeritus at the installation ceremony for his successor, the then Prince Andrew. A year later, in August 2016, a university building was renamed the "Sir Patrick Stewart Building".

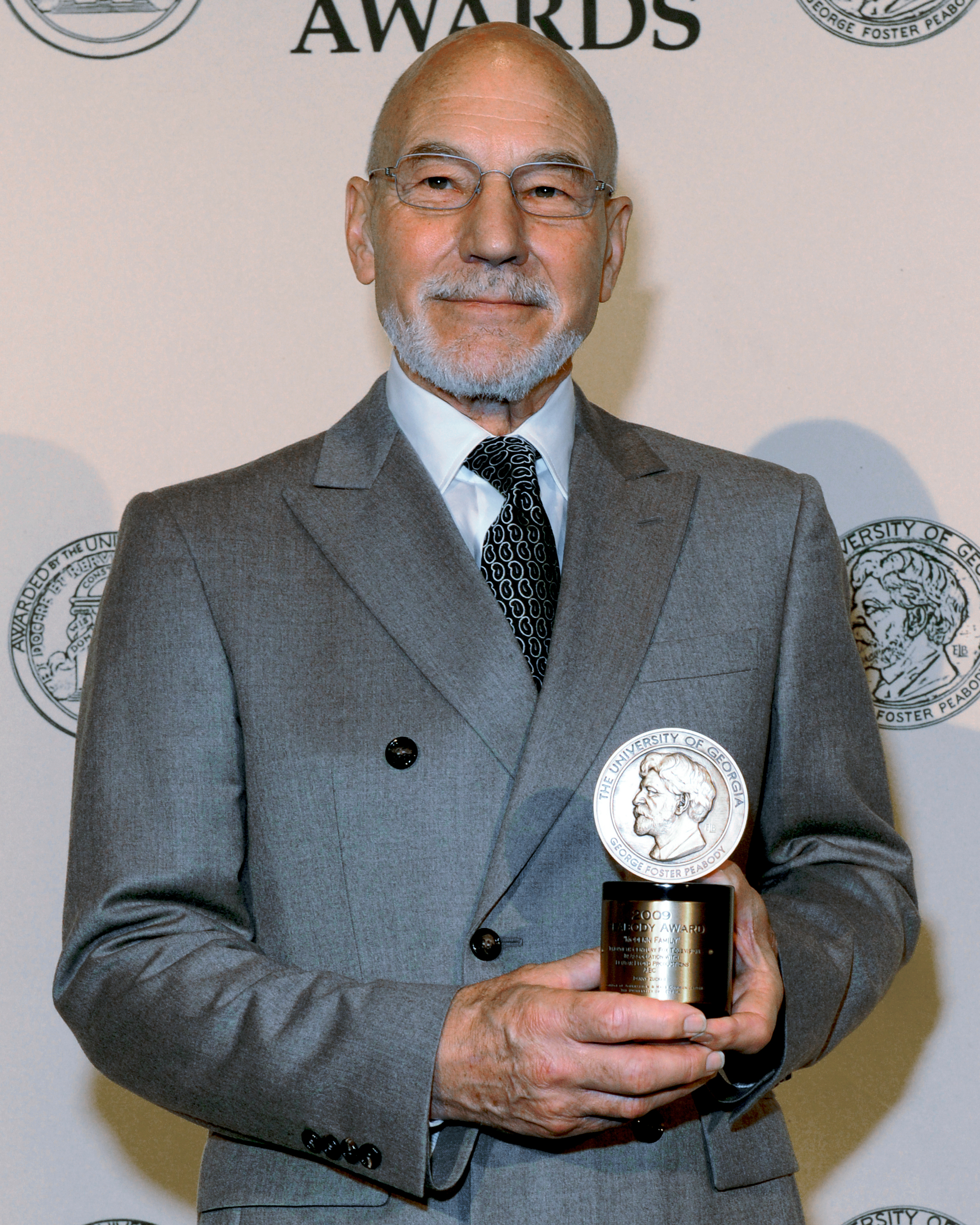
Stewart at the 2012 Peabody Awards

Stewart was made a Knight Bachelor in the 2010 New Year Honours for services to drama, and his knighthood was conferred by Queen Elizabeth II at an investiture ceremony at Buckingham Palace on 2 June 2010. He received an honorary Doctorate of Letters (D.Litt.) from the University of East Anglia in 2011, He carried the Olympic torch in July 2012 as part of the official relay for the 2012 London Summer Olympics and stated it was an experience he "will never forget", adding that it was better than any movie premiere.

Stewart received a DLitt from the University of Leeds in 2014, and was awarded an honorary doctorate (Dr hc) by the Vrije Universiteit Brussel in 2015. He was also an emeritus fellow of St Catherine's College, Oxford. A 2018 poll for Yorkshire Day ranked Stewart the third greatest Yorkshireman, behind Michael Palin and Sean Bean.

From 2017 to 2021, Stewart shared the Guinness World Record for the longest career as a live-action Marvel Comics superhero with Hugh Jackman, for their portrayals of Professor X and Wolverine, respectively; they were later surpassed by Tobey Maguire and Willem Dafoe. Stewart briefly regained the Guinness record in 2022 following his appearance in Doctor Strange in the Multiverse of Madness, before being surpassed again in 2024 by Wesley Snipes. With his posthumous appearance in Avengers: Doomsday, he is on track to again hold the record. In 2022, he was named an Honorary Fellow of the Institution of Engineering and Technology (Hon FIET), recognising his contributions to the promotion of science and technology.

On 9 November 2026, the International Astronomical Union named the asteroid (645530) Patrickstewart in his honor.

== Charity work and activism ==
In 2006, Stewart made a short video against domestic violence for Amnesty International, in which he recollected his father's physical attacks on his mother and the effect it had on him as a child. He said, "The physical harm ... [was] a shocking pain. But there are other aspects of violence which have more lasting impact psychologically on family members. It is destructive and tainting. As a child witnessing these events, one cannot simply help somehow feeling responsible for them; for the pain, and the screaming, and the misery." In the same year, he gave his name to a scholarship at the University of Huddersfield, where he was Chancellor (2004–2015), to fund post-graduate study into domestic violence. Stewart's childhood experience also led him to become a patron of Refuge, a UK charity for abused women, founded by Erin Pizzey.

In 2009, Stewart gave a speech at the launch of Created Equal, a book about women's rights, talking again about his personal experiences with domestic violence and the impacts they had on him. He said, "Violence is a choice, and it's a choice a man makes ... the lasting impact on my mother ... and indeed on myself ... was extreme. Overcoming the lessons of that male stereotype that I was being shown was a struggle." He expressed his hope to set an example of "what it has been like to be in an environment of such violence and that it can pass and that one can survive it and even though sometimes still a struggle." Additionally, in October 2011, he presented a BBC Lifeline Appeal on behalf of Refuge, discussing his own experience of domestic violence and interviewing a woman whose daughter was murdered by her ex-husband.

Stewart supported the armed forces charity Combat Stress after learning about his father's post-traumatic stress disorder when researching his family genealogy for the documentary series Who Do You Think You Are? He was a patron of the United Nations Association – UK, and delivered a speech at UNA-UK's UN Forum 2012 on 14 July 2012, speaking of his father's experiences in the Second World War, and how he believed the UN was the best legacy of that period.

On 15 April 2018, Stewart attended the launch event of the People's Vote, a campaign group calling for a public vote on the final Brexit deal between the UK and the European Union.

In 2019, he acted as an International Rescue Committee spokesperson.

Stewart was an avid advocate for pit bulls. He fostered several dogs through Wags and Walks, a dog rescue in Los Angeles, and was honoured at the rescue's annual gala in 2018. He partnered with the ASPCA in 2017 for their National Dog Fighting Awareness Day Campaign. He would frequently tweet pictures of himself with his foster dogs. In 2021, the ASPCA gave him their Pit Bull Advocate & Protector Award.

== Personal life ==
=== Relationships and children ===
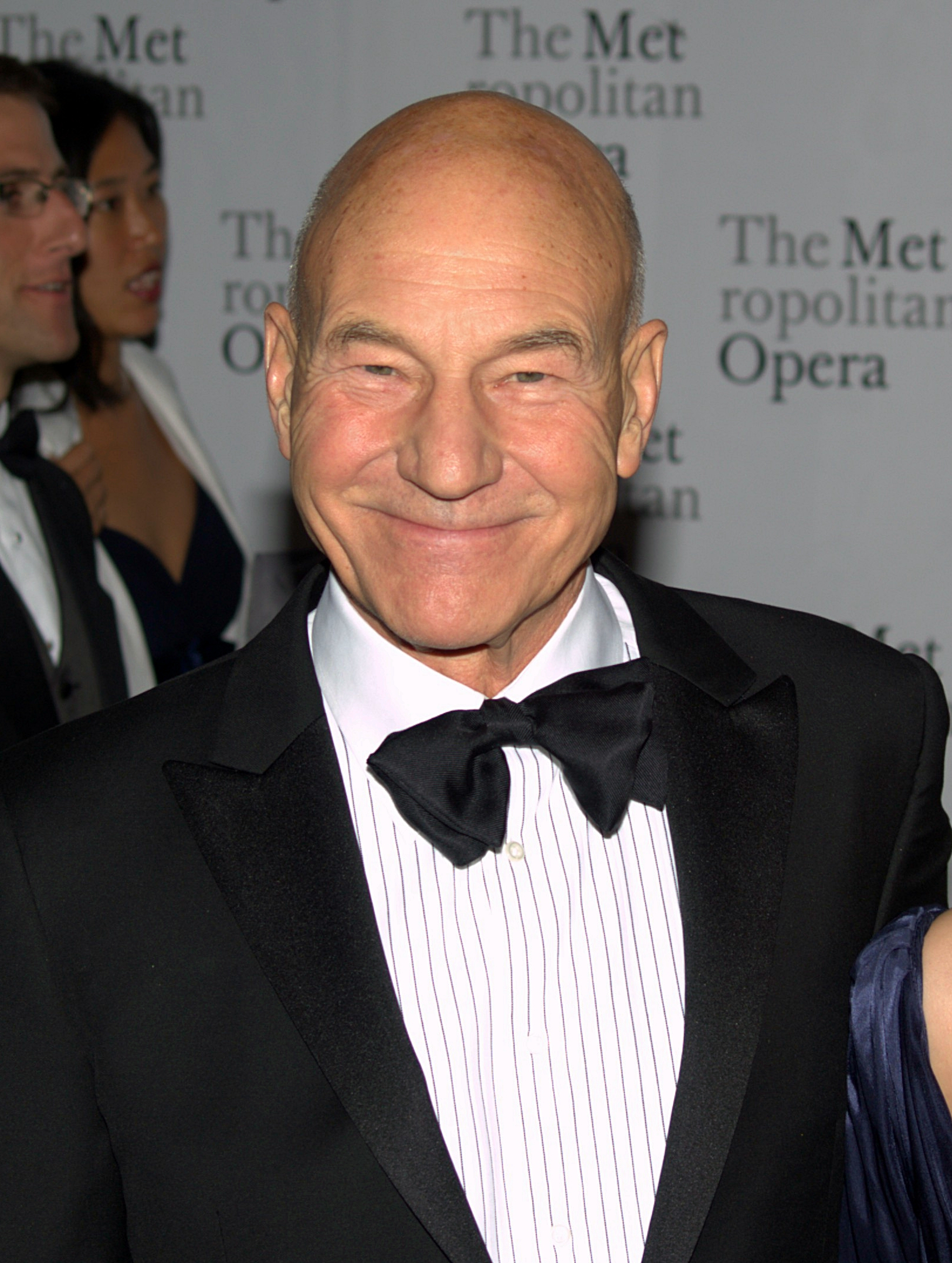
Stewart at the Metropolitan Opera's opening night of Das Rheingold, 2010

Stewart married his first wife, Sheila Falconer, in 1966; they divorced in 1990. They had a son, Daniel, and a daughter, Sophie. Daniel is also an actor and appeared alongside his father in the film Death Train, the sitcom Blunt Talk, and the Star Trek: The Next Generation episode "The Inner Light", playing his son in the latter. (Note: In the episode "The Inner Light", Daniel Stewart played Batai, son of Kamin, an alternate persona which Picard had unknowingly taken on for the purposes of that single episode's plot.) In his autobiography, Stewart said that he and American actress Jennifer Hetrick had an affair during Stewart's marriage to Falconer, causing a breakdown in their marriage. He said that he and Hetrick dated during parts of the run of Star Trek: The Next Generation and were engaged during the filming of "Qpid", although they never married.

In 1997, Stewart became engaged to American producer Wendy Neuss, one of the producers of Star Trek: The Next Generation. They married on 25 August 2000 and divorced three years later. (Note: In William Shatner's 2011 film The Captains, Stewart stated: "I have two major regrets, and they're both to do with the failure of – my failure in – my marriages.") Four months before his divorce from Neuss, Stewart co-starred with English actress Lisa Dillon in a production of The Master Builder, and the two were romantically involved until 2007.

In 2008, Stewart began dating American singer and songwriter Sunny Ozell, 38 years his junior, whom he met while performing in Macbeth at the Brooklyn Academy of Music. He purchased a home in Brooklyn's Park Slope neighbourhood in August 2012, and subsequently began living there with Ozell. In March 2013, it was reported that they were engaged, and they married on 7 September 2013 with Ian McKellen officiating. In 2020, Stewart revealed that his marriage to Ozell in Nevada had not been legally binding; the couple learned that McKellen's ministry credentials were not valid in Nevada, so they held a secret official ceremony with McKellen at a Mexican restaurant in Los Angeles a couple of weeks prior to the Nevada ceremony.

=== Beliefs, causes, and interests ===
Stewart stated that his politics were rooted in a belief in "fairness" and "equality". He considered himself a socialist and was a member of the Labour Party. He stated, "My father was a very strong trade unionist and those fundamental issues of Labour were ingrained into me." He was critical of the Iraq War and UK government legislation in the area of civil liberties, in particular its plans to extend detention without charge to 42 days for terrorist suspects. He signed an open letter of objection to this proposal in March 2008. In August 2018, he was widely misquoted by The Daily Telegraph and others, who announced that he had left Labour owing to concerns over the leadership of Jeremy Corbyn. He posted on Twitter to confirm that he had been misquoted and clarified that he had not left the party.

Stewart was an atheist and a patron of Humanists UK. He also identified as a feminist. He publicly advocated for the right to assisted suicide. In January 2011, he became a patron of Dignity in Dying and campaigned for an assisted dying law in the UK.

In August 2014, Stewart was one of 200 public figures who signed a letter to The Guardian expressing their hope that Scotland would vote to remain part of the United Kingdom in September's referendum on that issue. In 2016, Stewart was among more than 280 figures from the arts world who backed a vote to remain in the EU in the referendum on that issue.

On 2 March 2017, Stewart said he was going to apply for US citizenship to oppose the first presidency of Donald Trump. In an interview by the Press Association at the British Film Institute Luminous Fundraising Gala on 3 October 2017, he said that he hoped the US would pass stronger gun laws.

Stewart was a lifelong supporter of his local football club, Huddersfield Town. He was at Wembley Stadium in 2017 when the club won promotion to the top division for the first time since 1972. From 2010, he was president of Huddersfield Town Academy, the club's project for identifying and developing young talent. Stewart's last known public appearance was during a Huddersfield match against Crawley Town at Broadfield Stadium in November 2024. After Stewart's death, his Star Trek co-star Marina Sirtis recounted how they shared a joint love of football (she was a fan of Tottenham Hotspur F.C.). When Huddersfield played Tottenham in 2018, the contest was called the Star Trek derby in the match-day programme.

In an interview with American Theatre, he said: "From time to time, I have fantasies of becoming a concert pianist. I've been lucky enough through the years to work very closely with the great Emanuel Ax. I've said to him that if I could switch places with anyone it would be with him."

In 2015, Stewart defended the Belfast-based Christian bakers who were penalised for discrimination after refusing to bake a cake with words reading "Support Gay Marriage". He wrote on his Facebook account that while he was still opposed to organised religion, "It was not because it was a gay couple that they objected, it was not because they were celebrating some sort of marriage or an agreement between them. It was the actual words on the cake they objected to. Because they found the words offensive. I would support their rights to say 'No, this is personally offensive to my beliefs, I will not do it.'" The bakers ultimately won in a landmark Supreme Court decision for the United Kingdom, almost simultaneously with a similar case in the United States.

Stewart was an avid car enthusiast and was regularly seen at Silverstone during British Grand Prix weekends. He served as the grand marshal of the 2015 Grand Prix of Long Beach and conducted the podium interview with the top three finishers in the 2017 Canadian Grand Prix. On a 2003 appearance on Top Gear, he set a lap time of 1 minute and 50 seconds on the "Star in a Reasonably Priced Car" feature. He held a Motorsport UK competition licence and competed in the 2012 Silverstone Classic Celebrity Challenge race, finishing ninth, 3 m 02.808 s behind winner Kelvin Fletcher. In 2012, Stewart met his racing hero Stirling Moss for the BBC Two documentary Racing Legends.

Stewart was a fan of the animated television series Beavis and Butt-Head.

=== Illness and death ===
Stewart died at his home in Los Angeles on 28 October 2026, at the age of 86. His death was announced by his publicist, Kelly Bush Novak, the following day. According to the statement, he had been in the care of his wife, Sunny Ozell, following a "brief and poignant journey" with Alzheimer's disease and Lewy body dementia. His remains underwent aquamation on November 3.

Stewart's X-Men co-star Ian McKellen penned a tribute to Stewart on Instagram, and also performed "Underneath the Arches", a song Stewart and McKellen would sing to close out stage shows they co-starred in, as another tribute during a charity event. Numerous artists also paid tribute to Stewart including Hugh Jackman, Whoopi Goldberg and Dame Judi Dench.

== Book work ==
Written books

- Making It So: A Memoir. London / New York: Gallery Books, 2023 ISBN 9781982167738
- Foreword to Pearson, Roberta and Davies, Maire Messenger, Star Trek and American Television. Berkeley / Los Angeles: University of California Press, 2014 ISBN 978-0-520-27621-5

Audiobooks

- 2005: The Last Battle by C. S. Lewis
- 2006: A Christmas Carol by Charles Dickens (Audible)
- 2023: Making It So: A Memoir by himself
- 2026: Patrick Stewart Performs the Complete Sonnets of William Shakespeare
