= Making It So =

2023 book by Patrick Stewart

- Author: Patrick Stewart
- Language: English
- Genre: Memoir
- Publication date: 2023

Making It So: A Memoir is a 2023 book by the English actor Patrick Stewart. The memoir describes Stewart's life from an actor in Shakespeare plays to his famous role as Jean-Luc Picard in Star Trek: The Next Generation, with the title being a reference to that character's motto ("make it so"). He rejected offers from ghostwriters in order to write the memoir himself.

== Summary ==
Stewart was born in Mirfield, where he grew up in a working class household. His father, after being demobilized from the army, became an alcoholic and would abuse his wife. Stewart and his brother would intervene in the altercations to prevent their father from hurting their mother. As a young man, Stewart worked as a journalist and in sales at a furniture store. He pursued his ambition of acting on the side, before applying to a drama school and earning a full ride scholarship. Stewart worked in local theatres before unexpectedly receiving an offer to work small roles on a tour with The Old Vic for Twelfth Night, The Lady of the Camellias, and Duel of Angels, where he was the target of workplace bullying. Stewart was later hired by the Royal Shakespeare Company, where he worked for 14 years. He was married and has two children. While visiting a professor in Los Angeles, Stewart performed extracts from Shakespeare in a lecture open to both students and the public. This performance led to Paramount Pictures considering him for the Star Trek: The Next Generation cast. His initial meeting with Gene Roddenberry did not go well, but he was ultimately chosen for the role of Captain Jean-Luc Picard despite Roddenberry's objections.

Stewart was unfamiliar with Star Trek prior to the casting and prepared by watching the first four films. He had difficulty adjusting to behavioural norms in episodic television but managed the transition with help from other members of the cast. The 1988 Writers Guild of America strike prompted uncertainty about the series' future after the first season but filming resumed after it ended.

Stewart was knighted by Queen Elizabeth II.

== Reception ==
The book was described as demonstrating how Stewart reflects upon his career with some insecurity and was "surprise[d] at his own successes" in a review for The New York Times. Stewart's writing was praised as "personable prose" in The Washington Post, with the review also stating that it was too long at "several hundred pages". Lisa Dillon criticized the book for its depiction of their relationship. Stewart was interviewed by The Globe and Mail about the memoir, where he discussed subjects contained within it such as his interpersonal conflict with Gene Roddenberry.
