= My Memory of Us =

- Developer: Juggler Games
- Publisher: IMGN.PRO
- Platforms: PC; Nintendo Switch; PlayStation 4; Xbox One; iOS
- Release: October 9, 2018
- Genre: Puzzle platformer
- Mode: Single-player

My Memory of Us is a 2018 side-scrolling puzzle platformer video game developed by Juggler Games and published by IMGN.PRO. Framed as an elderly man narrating his childhood experiences, it follows two children who resist an oppressive robot occupation of their city. The player controls both children, who have their own specific abilities. The game is animated predominantly in black-and-white, with the color red used to highlight both puzzle mechanics and individuals identified as second-class citizens by the robot regime.

Developed as a tribute to the developers' families and their experiences, My Memory of Us has been read as an allegory for the Holocaust, with specific elements reflecting the Nazi occupation of Poland, the Warsaw Ghetto, and the experiences of Jews under Nazi regimes. The game, which drew international attention after hiring Patrick Stewart as narrator, was released to mixed reviews. Reviewers highlighted the visual design and music, but were critical of the game's controls and final boss fight.

== Plot ==
At a book shop, a girl finds an album. A photographs falls out of the album, depicting a young girl. The librarian begins telling a story of two friends.

These children, an unnamed boy and girl, eat and play together and share time with her family. Sirens sound, and the children's hometown is invaded by a robot army, with buildings destroyed by bombs. Individuals deemed inferior—including the girl and her grandfather—are forced to wear red by the occupying robots. They are segregated in a ghetto and are subjected to scorn and mockery from other residents.

The boy, seeking to play with his friend, reunites with her. They travel together through the occupied city, helping residents by stealing medicine and hanging posters while distracting the robot army. The occupation escalates, and ultimately the children help rescue a group of red-clad people from a train going to a concentration camp. Returning to the ghetto, they find only ruins and the grave of the girl's grandfather. They then find a couple to adopt the girl.

As the narrator finishes, the girl recognizes this story as that of her grandmother. The grandmother enters the room, reuniting with her childhood friend, the narrator.

== Gameplay ==
The boy and girl must work together to solve puzzles, with elements marked in red.

My Memory of Us is a side-scrolling puzzle platformer. It consists of eighteen chapters, each of which is introduced by the narrator. Otherwise, no text or dialogue is used; characters communicate through symbols and images in word balloons. The game is linear, though some collectibles—photographs identified as "memories"—require exploration. Several sequences include more action-oriented gameplay, including some in which the boy rides his bicycle.

Lead developer Łukasz Janczuk described My Memory of Us as a "one player co-op" game. The player controls two unnamed children, a boy and a girl. Each has different abilities. The male player character can move stealthily, use a mirror to blind patrolling guards, and steal objects. Meanwhile, the female player character moves more quickly, can lift the boy to higher levels, and wields a slingshot. When the characters hold hands, they share their abilities; they can run when the girl leads or hide when the boy is in front. The children's differing abilities are used to solve puzzles, which include decoding passwords and circumventing security systems. Some puzzles require the characters to work in tandem by pushing blocks. The abilities used by the children are predominantly defensive.

Animation is predominantly in black-and-white, with the color red serving to identify puzzle components. In later parts of the game, the color red also serves as a means of identifying persons declared second-class citizens by the ruling robot regime. The animation style is identified by JV as harkening back to the animated films of the 1930s and 1940s, while IGN describes it as painterly.

== Development ==
Patrick Stewart portrayed the narrator

My Memory of Us was developed by the Polish video game developer Juggler Games and published by IMGN.PRO. According to creative director Jakub Jabłoński, the game was intended as a tribute to the developers' families. He explained, "We wanted to tell their stories to the world, about their tough childhood experiences; about their nostalgia, their longing for real friendship, and about together opposing the great danger that is war." It was the developer's first game.

Music for the project was composed by Patryk Scelina. It includes violin solos by Katarzyna Wiszowski as well as a blend of guitar and synthesizer sounds. The narrator is played by Patrick Stewart; his involvement in the project drew international attention.

== Analysis ==
Although no overtly Nazi symbols are incorporated in the game, My Memory of Us has been read as an allegory of the Second World War, particularly the Nazi invasion of Poland and the creation of the Warsaw Ghetto. My Memory of Us has thus been described as a fairy tale, using a fantastical frame to make difficult themes more accessible. Paweł Schreiber of the Polish cultural portal Culture.pl noted that Jacek Dukaj had employed a similar approach in his novel Wroniec (2009), which had been illustrated by Jabłoński.

Several reviewers likened the robot overlords to the Nazis, with the Robot King as Adolf Hitler. Gamereactor wrote that, by using robots to represent Nazis, the game "emphasise[s] the soullessness and inhumanity of the occupiers". Reviewers compared the "Reds" in My Memory of Us to the experiences of Jews during the Holocaust. Marc Deschamps of Nintendojo emphasized one sequence, in which robots force the girl to dance at gunpoint before rewarding her with a dog bone, as particularly unnerving. Several reviewers likened the use of a black-and-white palette with red highlights to Steven Spielberg's use of the color in the film Schindler's List (1993).

Collecting "memories" allows the player to access historical information about the Second World War through the game's main menu; this includes information about individuals who were active during the Second World War. Sam Brooke of Push Square likened the game mechanic to that used by 1979 Revolution: Black Friday (2016). Deschamps wrote that such educational moments were particularly important in the face of polls showing reduced public knowledge of the Holocaust.

== Release and reception ==
Reception

Aggregate scores
Aggregator	Score
Metacritic	(PC) 69/100 (PS4) 67/100 (Xbox One) 69/100 (Nintendo Switch) 77/100
OpenCritic	68% recommend

My Memory of Us was released on October 9, 2018. It is available for PC, PlayStation 4, Xbox One, and Nintendo Switch. In November 2020, it was ported to iOS. The game received several accolades, including 1st at Indie Showcase and the 2017 Pixel Heaven award. It was a finalist for the 2017 Indie Prize and won the 2018 Indie Prize for best art. My Memory of Us was nominated at the 2018 SXSW Gaming Awards and for the 2018 Paszport Polityki.

As of 2026, the game has a score of 74 among top critics on the review aggregator OpenCritic and is recommended by 68% of critics. On the review aggregator Metacritic, the Nintendo Switch edition of My Memory of Us is the highest rated, with a metascore of 77/100 as of 2026, indicating "generally favorable reviews"; the PlayStation 4 edition is ranked lowest, with a metascore of 67, indicating "mixed or average" reviews. Reviewers highlighted the game's visual design and music, but were critical of its controls and final boss fight. Several indicated that the game was intended more for younger gamers.

Gamereactor considered My Memory of Us to be "a very accessible presentation of World War II", with a "truly great score", though it noted frustrations with the final boss battle. JV wrote that, although older gamers may consider the metaphors heavy-handed, the game provided a touching story. It considered the puzzles to be easy, but sometimes illogical and occasionally hampered by clunky controls. IGN wrote that the game "packs one of the heaviest themes of our generation in a cheerful jacket", with strong music and art, though the reviewer considered several mechanics underdeveloped. James O'Connor of GameSpot was more critical, considering the game's good intentions to be "obscured by dull gameplay and poor metaphors". He considered the "cuter aesthetic elements" to be disconnected from its dark story, and deemed the connection between "the impact and logic of your actions" to be unclear.

Reviewing the Playstation 4 release, PlayStation Universe's Laddie Simco described My Memory of Us as dealing with "heavy material" but nonetheless suitable for younger gamers and respectful to history. In terms of gameplay, Simco found the puzzles "entertaining and well executed", but considered the controls at times clunky and unresponsive. Brooke wrote that the game provided "an exciting and emotional trip through a dark period of human history", with tense gameplay and clever puzzles.

David Lloyd of Nintendo World Report, reviewing the Nintendo Switch release, highlighted the narration, writing that "his professionalism and expert narration got me hooked right". He praised the game's animation and emphasis on friendship, but criticized the "sluggish" controls. Deschamps considered the game a "gorgeous" and "unmissable experience", with "minor quibbles" related to puzzle difficulty and slowdown not undermining its "important" message. Nathanial Eker of Nintendo Life deemed the gameplay "solid", though conventional, with "exceptional celebrity voiceover work" and a generally strong story that was sometimes derailed by tonal shifts.

== Works cited ==
- Brooke, Sam (October 20, 2018). "My Memory of Us Review (PS4)". Push Square. Archived from the original on November 18, 2026.
- Deschamps, Marc (January 28, 2019). "Review: My Memory of Us (Switch)". Nintendojo. Archived from the original on November 19, 2026.
- Eker, Nathanial (September 16, 2024). "Mini Review: My Memory Of Us (Switch) - Powerful WW2 Allegory With Patrick Stewart & Robots". Nintendo Life. Archived from the original on November 19, 2026.
- Gregson-Wood, Stephen (November 5, 2020). "My Memory of Us, the Emotional WW2 Adventure Game, Is Available Now for iOS". Pocket Gamer. Archived from the original on November 19, 2026.
- Lemne, Bengt (May 8, 2018). "My Memory of Us Is a Game about Friendship". Gamereactor. Archived from the original on November 18, 2026.
- Lloyd, David (January 24, 2019). "My Memory of Us (Switch) Review". Nintendo World Report. Archived from the original on November 18, 2026.
- "My Memory of Us". Gamereactor. October 9, 2018. Archived from the original on November 18, 2026.
- "My Memory of Us". OpenCritic. Archived from the original on November 18, 2026.
- "My Memory of Us Critic Reviews". Metacritic. Archived from the original on November 18, 2026.
- "My Memory of Us – Review". IGN. November 21, 2018. Archived from the original on November 18, 2026.
- "My Memory of Us: Un Conte Dramatique pas Dénué de Charme ni de Défauts" [My Memory of Us: A Dramatic Tale Not Without Charm nor Flaws]. JV (in French). October 14, 2018. Archived from the original on November 18, 2026.
- O'Connor, James (October 8, 2018). "My Memory of Us Review – War Has Changed". GameSpot. Archived from the original on November 19, 2026.
- Schreiber, Paweł (February 27, 2023). "Poland's Coolest Video Games for Children". Culture.pl. Archived from the original on January 31, 2026.
- Simco, Laddie (November 12, 2018). "My Memory Of Us Review – PS4". PlayStation Universe. Archived from the original on November 18, 2026.
- Smith, Olly (October 29, 2020). "Award-winning WWII Fairytale My Memory of Us Goes Mobile". Pocket Gamer. Archived from the original on November 19, 2026.
- Walker, John (February 19, 2017). "My Memory Of Us Review – PS4". Rock Paper Shotgun. Archived from the original on November 18, 2026.
- Widmann, Tabea (2023). The Game is the Memory: Prosthetic Witnessing in Digitalen Spielen als Erinnerungsmedien um den Holocaust [The Game Is the Memory: Prosthetic Witnessing in Digital Games as Media of Remembrance Regarding the Holocaust] (in German). Göttingen: V&R Unipress. ISBN 978-3-8470-1601-4.
