= Norman Fenton =

British mathematician and computer scientist

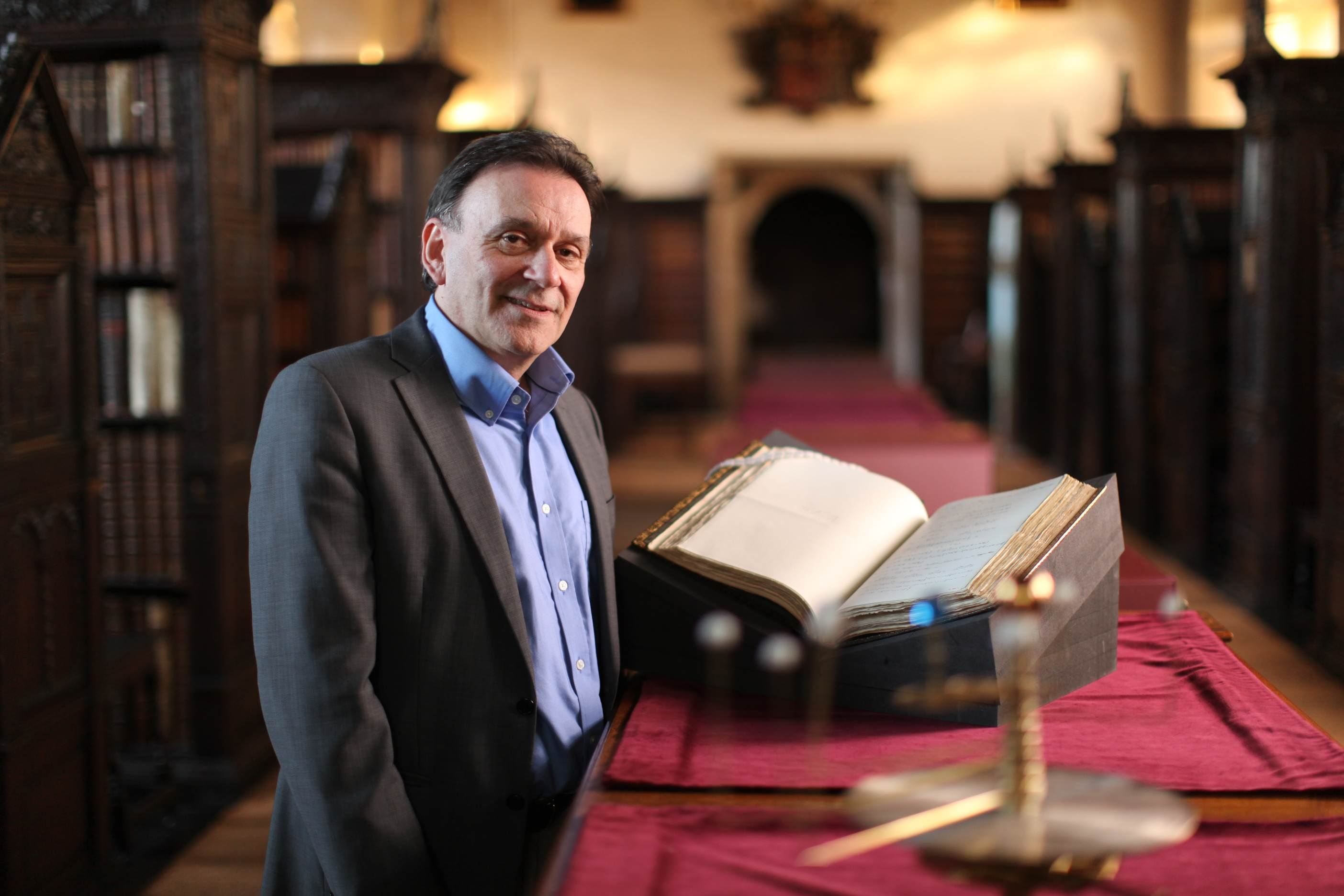
- Fenton in 2016
- Born: 18 May 1956 (age 70)
- Education: London School of Economics; University of Sheffield
- Scientific career
- Fields: Combinatorics; Bayesian networks; Artificial intelligence; Legal reasoning; Software engineering; Software metrics
- Workplaces: Queen Mary University of London; City University London; South Bank University; University of Bonn; Oxford University; University College Dublin
- Thesis: Representation of matroids (1981)
- Doctoral advisor: Peter Vámos
- Website: www.normanfenton.com

Norman Elliott Fenton (born 18 May 1956) is a British mathematician and computer scientist. He is the Professor of Risk Information Management in the School of Electronic Engineering and Computer Science at Queen Mary University of London. He is known for his work in software metrics and is the author of the textbook Software Metrics: A Rigorous Approach, as of 2014 in its third edition.

== Education ==
Fenton received his bachelor's degree in mathematics from the London School of Economics in 1978. He earned his Master of Science in 1978 and Doctor of Philosophy in 1981 at the University of Sheffield. At Sheffield he was the second research student of Peter Vámos. His doctoral thesis was "Representations of Matroids".

== Career ==
Fenton was a postdoctoral fellow in the mathematics department at University College Dublin from 1981 to 1982 and the Mathematics Institute of the University of Oxford from 1982 to 1984. At the end of that period he changed fields and began publishing papers on structured programming with Robin W. Whitty and Agnes A. Kaposi. In 1984, he joined the department of Electrical and Electronic Engineering at South Bank Polytechnic in London where he headed the Centre for Software and Systems Engineering research group. He began to publish on software metrics as well as program structure.

In 1989, Fenton moved to City University as a reader in software reliability, and became a professor of Computing Science in 1992.

In 1998, Fenton, along with Martin Neil and Ed Tranham, set up the company Agena Ltd in Cambridge. Fenton was CEO between 1998 and 2015 and remains a director. In 2000, Fenton joined Queen Mary University of London (School of Electronic Engineering and Computer Science) where he works part–time as a professor. He is the director of the Risk and Information Management Research Group.

In August 2025, he joined the policy college of Advance UK.

== Selected publications ==
Textbooks

- Fenton, Norman E. (1991). Software Metrics: A Rigorous Approach. Chapman & Hall. ISBN 978-0-412-40440-5. OCLC 1069086327.

- Fenton, Norman E.; Pfleeger, Shari Lawrence (1997). Software Metrics: A Rigorous and Practical Approach (2 ed.). International Thomson Computer Press. ISBN 978-0-534-95600-4. OCLC 1055171425.
- Fenton, Norman; Bieman, James (1 October 2014). Software Metrics: A Rigorous and Practical Approach (3 ed.). Taylor & Francis. ISBN 978-1-4398-3822-8. OCLC 491888703.

- Fenton, Norman; Neil, Martin (3 September 2018). Risk Assessment and Decision Analysis with Bayesian Networks (2 ed.). CRC Press, Taylor & Francis Group. ISBN 978-1-138-03511-9. OCLC 1031043793.
- Fenton, N.E. and M. Neil, Fighting Goliath: Exposing the flawed science and statistics behind the COVID-19 event. 2024 Sovereign Rights Publishing, ISBN 978-1-0687498-3-4, 2024

Articles

- Fenton, N. (1994). "Software measurement: a necessary scientific basis". IEEE Transactions on Software Engineering. 20 (3): 199–206. doi:10.1109/32.268921.
- Fenton, N.; Pfleeger, S.L.; Glass, R.L. (1994). "Science and substance: a challenge to software engineers". IEEE Software. 11 (4): 86–95. doi:10.1109/52.300094. S2CID 8528640.
- Kitchenham, B.; Pfleeger, S.L.; Fenton, N. (1995). "Towards a framework for software measurement validation". IEEE Transactions on Software Engineering. 21 (12): 929–944. doi:10.1109/32.489070.
- Fenton, N.E.; Neil, M. (1999). "A critique of software defect prediction models". IEEE Transactions on Software Engineering. 25 (5): 675–689. doi:10.1109/32.815326.
- Fenton, Norman E; Neil, Martin (1999). "Software metrics: successes, failures and new directions". Journal of Systems and Software. 47 (2–3): 149–157. doi:10.1016/S0164-1212(99)00035-7.
- Fenton, N.E.; Ohlsson, N. (2000). "Quantitative analysis of faults and failures in a complex software system". IEEE Transactions on Software Engineering. 26 (8): 797–814. doi:10.1109/32.879815.
- Fenton, Norman E.; Neil, Martin (2000). Software metrics: Roadmap. ICSE '00: Proceedings of the Conference on The Future of Software Engineering May 2000. pp. 357–370. doi:10.1145/336512.336588.
- Neil, Martin; Fenton, Norman; Nielson, Lars (2000). "Building large-scale Bayesian networks". The Knowledge Engineering Review. 15 (3): 257–284. doi:10.1017/S0269888900003039. S2CID 11309502.
- Fenton, Norman; Neil, Martin; Marsh, William; Hearty, Peter; Marquez, David; Krause, Paul; Mishra, Rajat (2007). "Predicting software defects in varying development lifecycles using Bayesian nets". Information and Software Technology. 49 (1): 32–43. doi:10.1016/j.infsof.2006.09.001.
