= The Lion in Winter (2003 film) =

2003 American television film by Andrei Konchalovsky

- Promotional poster
- Genre: Drama
- Based on: The Lion in Winter; 1966 play by James Goldman
- Teleplay by: James Goldman
- Directed by: Andrei Konchalovsky
- Starring: Patrick Stewart; Glenn Close; Andrew Howard; John Light; Rafe Spall
- Music by: Richard Hartley
- Country of origin: United States
- Original language: English

Production
- Executive producers: Robert Halmi Sr.; Robert Halmi Jr.; Martin Poll; Patrick Stewart; Wendy Neuss-Stewart
- Producer: Dyson Lovell
- Cinematography: Sergey Kozlov
- Editor: Henry Richardson
- Running time: 167 minutes
- Production companies: Hallmark Entertainment; Flying Freehold Productions; HCC Happy Crew Company; Matt IV

Original release
- Release: December 26, 2003 (UK)
- Network: Showtime
- Release: May 26, 2004

The Lion in Winter is a 2003 American drama television film based on the 1966 play of the same name by James Goldman, and his screenplay for the 1968 film. It starred Patrick Stewart and Glenn Close, and was directed by Andrei Konchalovsky.

The film was first shown on December 26, 2003, in the United Kingdom, and premiered in the United States on Showtime on May 26, 2004. It was filmed on location at Spiš Castle in eastern Slovakia, interiors were filmed in Budapest, Hungary.

Andrew Howard, John Light, and Rafe Spall played the warring brothers. Jonathan Rhys Meyers played the king of France and Julia Vysotskaya, his sister and Henry's mistress, Princess Alais.

== Plot ==
In the year 1183, Henry II of England, who also rules large parts of France within his Angevin Empire, has invited his three surviving sons, his imprisoned and estranged wife Eleanor and the king of France, who has recently come of age, to join him at his Christmas court at Chinon Castle. His eldest son Henry has died and now the king must decide upon a new heir. King Henry favours his youngest John. Eleanor favours the oldest son Richard. The film shows the intra-family disputes which take place over the next few days. At the end, everyone disperses with nothing resolved for the future.

== Cast ==
- Patrick Stewart as Henry II
- Glenn Close as Eleanor of Aquitaine
- Andrew Howard as Richard the Lionheart
- John Light as Geoffrey
- Rafe Spall as John
- Jonathan Rhys Meyers as King Philip II
- Julia Vysotskaya as Alais
- Clive Wood as Captain William Marshall
- Antal Konrad as Toastmaster
- Soma Marko as Young John

== Reception ==
Brian Lowry of Variety wrote that the film "is a long sit but nevertheless a rewarding one". Of Close's performance, he wrote that "her Eleanor manages to stand apart from Hepburn's".

== Awards and nominations ==
The Lion in Winter was nominated for six Emmy Awards, winning one award for Outstanding Costumes for a Miniseries, Movie, or Special. Glenn Close won a Golden Globe Award and Screen Actors Guild Award for her performance.

Award	Category	Nominee(s)	Result	Ref.
Primetime Emmy Awards	Outstanding Made for Television Movie	Robert Halmi Jr., Robert Halmi Sr., Wendy Neuss-Stewart, Martin Poll and Patrick Stewart, executive producers; Dyson Lovell, producer	Nominated	
Primetime Emmy Awards	Outstanding Lead Actress in a Miniseries or Movie	Glenn Close	Nominated	
Primetime Emmy Awards	Outstanding Directing for a Miniseries or Movie	Andrei Konchalovsky	Nominated	
Primetime Emmy Awards	Outstanding Costumes for a Miniseries, Movie or Special	Consolata Boyle, Costume Designer; Rhona McGuirke, Costume Supervisor; Magdalen Rubalcava, Assistant Costume Designer	Won	
Primetime Emmy Awards	Outstanding Art Direction for a Miniseries or Movie	Roger Hall, Production Designer; Janos Szabolcs, Art Director; Istvan Toth, Set Decorator	Nominated	
Primetime Emmy Awards	Outstanding Hairstyling for a Miniseries or Movie	Martial Corneville, Hairstylist for Ms. Close; Silka Lisku, Hairstylist for Mr. Stewart; Klara Szinek, Hairstylist	Nominated	
Golden Globe Awards	Best Miniseries or Television Film	Robert Halmi	Nominated	
Golden Globe Awards	Best Actor in a Miniseries or Television Film	Patrick Stewart	Nominated	
Golden Globe Awards	Best Actress in a Miniseries or Television Film	Glenn Close	Won	
Screen Actors Guild Awards	Outstanding Female Actor in a Miniseries or Television Film	Glenn Close	Won	

=== Other awards ===
Costume Designers Guild

- Excellence in Costume Design for Television – Fantasy or Period (Nominated)

Producers Guild of America Awards

- Television Producer of the Year Award – Longform (Nominated)

== See also ==
- List of historical drama films
- The Lion in Winter (play)
- The Lion in Winter (1968 film)
