= 2019 WhatsOnStage Awards =

British theatre awards

- Date: 3 March 2019
- Venue: Prince of Wales Theatre
- Most awards: "Hamilton" (5)
- Most nominations: "Hamilton" (12)

The WhatsOnStage Awards, founded in 2001 as the Theatregoers' Choice Awards, are a fan-driven set of awards organised by the theatre website WhatsOnStage.com, based on a popular vote recognising performers and productions of English theatre, with an emphasis on London's West End theatre.

The 2019 Whatsonstage Awards, the 19th, took place on Sunday, 3 March 2019 at the Prince of Wales Theatre. The Awards Concert was presented by Vicky Vox and Kobna Holdbrook-Smith, with performances from Carrie Hope Fletcher and the West End casts of Six and Spring Awakening.

The winners and nominees were:

Best New Play	Best New Musical
The Inheritance; Dust; Girls & Boys; The Jungle; Misty	Heathers the Musical; Eugenius!; Hamilton; Tina – The Tina Turner Musical; Six
Best Play Revival	Best Musical Revival
The Madness of George III; The Lieutenant of Inishmore; Summer and Smoke; Translations; The York Realist	Little Shop of Horrors; Chess; Company; The King & I; Me and My Girl
Best Actor in a Play	Best Actress in a Play
Aidan Turner for The Lieutenant of Inishmore; Arinzé Kene for Misty; Colin Morgan for Transalations; Kyle Soller for The Inheritance; Mark Gatiss for The Madness of George III	Sophie Okonedo for Anthony and Cleopatra; Carey Mulligan for Girls & Boys; Charlie Murphy for The Lieutenant of Inishmore; Katherine Parkinson for Home, I’m Darling; Patsy Ferran for Summer and Smoke
Best Actor in a Musical	Best Actress in a Musical
Jamael Westman for Hamilton; Giles Terera for Hamilton; Kobna Holdbrook-Smith for Tina – The Tina Turner Musical; Jamie Muscato for Heathers the Musical; Rob Houchen for Eugenius!	Carrie Hope Fletcher for Heathers the Musical; Adrienne Warren for Tina – The Tina Turner Musical; Laura Baldwin for Eugenius!; Rachelle Ann Go for Hamilton; Rosalie Craig for Company
Best Supporting Actor in a Play	Best Supporting Actress in a Play
Adrian Scarborough for The Madness of George III; Adetomiwa Edun for Translations; Andrew Burnap for The Inheritance; Chris Walley for The Lieutenant of Inishmore; Paul Hilton for The Inheritance	Vanessa Redgrave for The Inheritance; Debra Gillett for The Madness of George III; Michelle Fairley for Julius Caesar; Michelle Fox for Translations; Sian Thomas for Home, I’m Darling
Best Supporting Actor in a Musical	Best Supporting Actress in a Musical
Jason Pennycooke for Hamilton; Cleve September for Hamilton; Daniel Buckley for Eugenius!; Jonathan Bailey for Company; Richard Fleeshman for Company	Patti LuPone for Company; Christine Allado for Hamilton; Jodie Steele for Heathers the Musical; Rachel John for Hamilton; Vicky Vox for Little Shop of Horrors
Best Direction	Best Choreography
Marianne Elliott for Company; Andy Fickman for Heathers the Musical; Michael Grandage for The Lieutenant of Inishmore; Stephen Daldry for The Inheritance; Thomas Kail for Hamilton	Andy Blankenbuehler for Hamilton; Carrie-Anne Ingrouille for Six; Drew McOnie for Strictly Ballroom; Liam Steel for Company; Lizzi Gee for Little Shop of Horrors
Best Set Design	Best Costume Design
Tom Scutt for Little Shop of Horrors; Bunny Christie for Company; Es Devlin for Girls & Boys; Miriam Buether for The Jungle; Rae Smith for Translations	Paul Tazewell for Hamilton; Catherine Martin for Strictly Ballroom; Catherine Zuber for The King & I; Gabriella Slade for Six; Tom Scutt for Little Shop of Horrors
Best Lighting Design	Best Video Design
Howell Binkley for Hamilton; Ben Cracknell for Heathers the Musical; Howard Hudson for Little Shop of Horrors; Neil Austin for Company; Tim Deiling for Six	Terry Scruby for Chess; Daniel Denton for Misty; Dick Straker for A Monster Calls; Luke Halls for The Lehman Trilogy; Nina Dunn for The Assassination of Katie Hopkins
Best Off-West End Production	Best Regional Production
Six; Dust; Eugenius!; Misty; The Rink	Spring Awakening; Death of a Salesman; The Madness of George III; Memoirs of an Asian Football Casual; Romeo and Juliet
Best Original Cast Recording	Best Show Poster
Everybody’s Talking About Jamie; Bat Out of Hell; Come From Away; The Grinning Man; Six	Little Shop of Horrors; The Inheritance; The Jungle; The Lieutenant of Inishmore; Tina – The Tina Turner Musical
Best West End Show
Les Misérables; Bat Out of Hell; Everybody’s Talking About Jamie; Kinky Boots; Wicked
Equity Award for Services to Theatre Society Special Award
Michael Grandage
