= 64th Evening Standard Theatre Awards =

Annual Theatre Awards

- Date: 18 November 2018
- Location: Theatre Royal, Drury Lane
- Hosted by: Phoebe Waller-Bridge

Highlights
- Most wins: Antony and Cleopatra, Company and Hamilton (2)
- Most nominations: Company (4)

The 64th Evening Standard Theatre Awards were awarded in recognition of the 2017–18 London Theatre season on 18 November 2018 at the Theatre Royal, Drury Lane. Nominations were announced in November 2018. The ceremony was presented by Phoebe Waller-Bridge and co-hosted by Idris Elba, Claire Foy, Evgeny Lebedev and Anna Wintour.

== Eligibility and nominators ==
All new productions and performances on the London stage between 20 October 2017 and 16 October 2018 were eligible for consideration.

The Advisory Judging Panel consisted of Evening Standard chief theatre critic Henry Hitchings, Daily Mail columnist Baz Bamigboye, The Guardian culture writer and broadcaster Mark Lawson, WhatsOnStage theatre critic Sarah Crompton, The New York Times International theatre critic Matt Wolf and Evening Standard editor George Osborne.

== Ceremony ==
=== Presenters ===
- Claire Foy presented Best Actor
- Richard Madden presented the Natasha Richardson Award for Best Actress
- Idris Elba presented Best Musical
- Bea Carrozzini, Charles Wintour’s granddaughter, presented the Most Promising Playwright Award named in his honour
- Stella McCartney presented Best Design
- Patti LuPone presented the Lebedev Award
- John Galliano provided a tribute to theatre dressers

=== Performances ===
- Jonathan Bailey, Alex Gaumond and Daisy Maywood performed "Getting Married Today" from Company
- Michael Jibson performed "You’ll Be Back" from Hamilton
- Sharon D. Clarke performed "Lot’s Wife" from Caroline, or Change

=== Sponsors ===
The 'Official Platinum Partner' was Michael Kors, and the following awards were presented in partnership:

- Best Play was awarded in partnership with Chanel
- Best Actor was awarded in partnership with the Ambassador Theatre Group
- The Natasha Richardson Award for Best Actress was awarded in partnership with Christian Louboutin
- Emerging Talent was awarded in partnership with Access Entertainment
- The tribute to theatre dressers was presented in partnership with Maison Margiela

Audi, Laurent-Perrier, Monica Vinader and Tommy Hilfiger were also event partners.

== Non-competitive awards ==
The Lebedev Award went to Cameron Mackintosh in recognition for his contribution to musical theatre.

== Winners and nominees ==
Best Play	Best Musical
The Inheritance by Matthew Lopez, Noël Coward Theatre and Young Vic; Home, I’m Darling by Laura Wade, National Theatre Dorfman; John by Annie Baker, National Theatre Dorfman; The Lehman Trilogy by Stefano Massini and Ben Power, National Theatre Lyttelton; The Writer by Ella Hickson, Almeida Theatre	Hamilton, Victoria Palace Theatre; Caroline, or Change, Hampstead Theatre and Minerva Theatre Chichester; Company, Gielgud Theatre; Everybody’s Talking About Jamie, Apollo Theatre; Fun Home, Young Vic
Best Actor	Natasha Richardson Award for Best Actress
Ralph Fiennes, Antony and Cleopatra, National Theatre Olivier; Bryan Cranston, Network, National Theatre Lyttelton; Ian McKellen, King Lear, Duke of York’s Theatre and Minerva Theatre Chichester; Colin Morgan, Translations, National Theatre Olivier; Kyle Soller, The Inheritance, Noël Coward Theatre and Young Vic	Sophie Okonedo, Antony and Cleopatra, National Theatre Olivier; Laura Linney, My Name Is Lucy Barton, Bridge Theatre; Carey Mulligan, Girls and Boys, Royal Court Theatre; Cecilia Noble, Nine Night, National Theatre Dorfman; Lia Williams, The Prime of Miss Jean Brodie, Donmar Warehouse
Best Musical Performance	Milton Shulman Award for Best Director
Rosalie Craig, Company, Gielgud Theatre; Sharon D. Clarke, Caroline, or Change, Hampstead Theatre and Minerva Theatre Chichester; Arinzé Kene, Misty, Bush Theatre and Trafalgar Studios; Kelli O’Hara, The King and I, London Palladium; Adrienne Warren, Tina, Aldwych Theatre	Marianne Elliott, Company, Gielgud Theatre; Stephen Daldry, The Inheritance, Noël Coward Theatre and Young Vic; Robert Hastie, The York Realist, Donmar Warehouse; Phyllida Lloyd, Tina, Aldwych Theatre; Ian Rickson, Translations, National Theatre Olivier
Best Design	Charles Wintour Award for Most Promising Playwright
Miriam Buether, The Jungle, Playhouse Theatre and Young Vic; Bunny Christie, Company, Gielgud Theatre; Es Devlin, Girls and Boys, Royal Court Theatre; Rae Smith, Translations, National Theatre Olivier; Jan Versweyveld, Network, National Theatre Lyttelton	Natasha Gordon, Nine Night, National Theatre; Tearrance Arvelle Chisholm, Br’er Cotton, Theatre503; Francis Turnly, The Great Wave, National Theatre Dorfman
Emerging Talent Award
Jamael Westman, Hamilton, Victoria Palace Theatre; Rona Morison, The Prime of Miss Jean Brodie, Donmar Warehouse; Debris Stevenson, Poet in da Corner, Royal Court Theatre; Chris Walley, The Lieutenant of Inishmore, Noël Coward Theatre; Roy Alexander Weise, Nine Night and Br’er Cotton, National Theatre Dorfman and Theatre503

=== Multiple awards ===
2 awards

- Antony and Cleopatra
- Company
- Hamilton

=== Multiple nominations ===
4 nominations

- Company

3 nominations

- The Inheritance
- Nine Night
- Translations

2 nominations

- Antony and Cleopatra
- Br’er Cotton
- Caroline, or Change
- Girls and Boys
- Hamilton
- Network
- The Prime of Miss Jean Brodie
- Tina

== See also ==
- 2017 Laurence Olivier Awards
- 2018 Laurence Olivier Awards
