= 2019 Laurence Olivier Awards =

Award ceremony

- Date: 7 April 2019
- Location: Royal Albert Hall
- Hosted by: Jason Manford
- Most wins: Come from Away / Company / The Inheritance (4)
- Most nominations: Come from Away / Company (9)

Television/radio coverage
- Network: ITV (television); Magic (radio)

The 2019 Laurence Olivier Awards was held on 7 April 2019 at the Royal Albert Hall. The ceremony was hosted by Jason Manford.

== Eligibility ==
Any new production that opened between 22 February 2018 and 19 February 2019 in a theatre represented in the membership of the Society of London Theatre is eligible for consideration, provided it has performed at least 30 performances.

== Event calendar ==
- 1 March: Matthew Bourne announced as the recipient of the Society Special Award
- 4 March: Jason Manford announced as host
- 5 March: Nominations announced by Sheila Atim and Giles Terera
- 7 April: Award ceremony held

== Winners and nominees ==
The nominations were announced on 5 March 2019 in 26 categories.

Best New Play	Best New Musical
The Inheritance by Matthew Lopez, based on original text by E. M. Forster – Young Vic and Noël Coward Theatre; The Lehman Trilogy by Stefano Massini, adapted by Ben Power – National Theatre Lyttelton; Misty by Arinzé Kene – Trafalgar Studios 1; Sweat by Lynn Nottage – Donmar Warehouse	Come from Away – Phoenix Theatre; Fun Home – Young Vic; Six – Arts Theatre; Tina – Aldwych Theatre
Best Revival	Best Musical Revival
Summer and Smoke – Almeida Theatre and Duke of York's Theatre; King Lear – Duke of York's Theatre; The Lieutenant of Inishmore – Noël Coward Theatre; The Price – Wyndham's Theatre	Company – Gielgud Theatre; Caroline, or Change – Playhouse Theatre; The King and I – London Palladium
Best New Comedy	Best Entertainment and Family
Home, I'm Darling by Laura Wade – National Theatre Dorfman and Duke of York's Theatre; Nine Night by Natasha Gordon – National Theatre Dorfman and Trafalgar Studios 1; Quiz by James Graham – Noël Coward Theatre	A Monster Calls – Old Vic; Snow White – London Palladium; Songs for Nobodies – Ambassadors Theatre; The Wider Earth – Jerwood Gallery, Natural History Museum
Best Actor	Best Actress
Kyle Soller as Eric Glass in The Inheritance – Young Vic and Noël Coward Theatre; Simon Russell Beale, Adam Godley and Ben Miles as Henry Lehman, Emanuel Lehman and Mayer Lehman in The Lehman Trilogy – National Theatre Lyttelton; Arinzé Kene as Arinzé in Misty – Trafalgar Studios 1; Ian McKellen as Lear in King Lear – Duke of York's Theatre; David Suchet as Gregory Solomon in The Price – Wyndham's Theatre	Patsy Ferran as Alma Winemiller in Summer and Smoke – Almeida Theatre and Duke of York's Theatre; Gillian Anderson as Margo Channing in All About Eve – Noël Coward Theatre; Eileen Atkins as Madeleine in The Height of the Storm – Wyndham's Theatre; Sophie Okonedo as Cleopatra in Antony and Cleopatra – National Theatre Olivier; Katherine Parkinson as Judy in Home, I'm Darling – National Theatre Dorfman and Duke of York's Theatre
Best Actor in a Musical	Best Actress in a Musical
Kobna Holdbrook-Smith as Ike Turner in Tina – Aldwych Theatre; Marc Antolin as Seymour Krelborn in Little Shop of Horrors – Regent's Park Open Air Theatre; Zubin Varla as Bruce Bechdel in Fun Home – Young Vic; Ken Watanabe as The King of Siam in The King and I – London Palladium	Sharon D. Clarke as Caroline Thibodeaux in Caroline, or Change – Playhouse Theatre; Rosalie Craig as Bobbie in Company – Gielgud Theatre; Kelli O'Hara as Anna Leonowens in The King and I – London Palladium; Adrienne Warren as Tina Turner in Tina – Aldwych Theatre
Best Actor in a Supporting Role	Best Actress in a Supporting Role
Chris Walley as Davey in The Lieutenant of Inishmore – Noël Coward Theatre; Keir Charles as Chris Tarrant and Various in Quiz – Noël Coward Theatre; Adam Gillen as Chris Smith in Killer Joe – Trafalgar Studios 1; Adrian Lukis as Walter Franz in The Price – Wyndham's Theatre; Malcolm Sinclair as Dwight D. Eisenhower in Pressure – Ambassadors Theatre	Monica Dolan as Karen Richards in All about Eve – Noël Coward Theatre; Susan Brown as Sylvia in Home, I'm Darling – National Theatre Dorfman and Duke of York's Theatre; Cecilia Noble as Aunt Maggie in Nine Night – National Theatre Dorfman and Trafalgar Studios 1; Vanessa Redgrave as Margaret in The Inheritance – Young Vic and Noël Coward Theatre
Best Actor in a Supporting Role in a Musical	Best Actress in a Supporting Role in a Musical
Jonathan Bailey as Jamie in Company – Gielgud Theatre; Clive Carter as Claude and Various in Come from Away – Phoenix Theatre; Richard Fleeshman as Andy in Company – Gielgud Theatre; Robert Hands as Doug, Nick and Various in Come from Away – Phoenix Theatre	Patti LuPone as Joanne in Company – Gielgud Theatre; Aimie Atkinson, Alexia McIntosh, Millie O'Connell, Natalie Paris, Maiya Quansah-Breed and Jarneia Richard-Noel as Katherine Howard, Anne of Cleves, Anne Boleyn, Jane Seymour, Catherine Parr and Catherine of Aragon in Six – Arts Theatre; Ruthie Ann Miles as Lady Thiang in The King and I – London Palladium; Rachel Tucker as Annette, Beverley Bass and Various in Come from Away – Phoenix Theatre
Best Director	Best Theatre Choreographer
Stephen Daldry for The Inheritance – Young Vic and Noël Coward Theatre; Christopher Ashley for Come from Away – Phoenix Theatre; Marianne Elliott for Company – Gielgud Theatre; Rebecca Frecknall for Summer and Smoke – Almeida Theatre and Duke of York's Theatre; Sam Mendes for The Lehman Trilogy – National Theatre Lyttelton	Kelly Devine for Come from Away – Phoenix Theatre; Christopher Gattelli (based on original choreography by Jerome Robbins) for The King and I – London Palladium; Carrie-Anne Ingrouille for Six – Arts Theatre; Liam Steel for Company – Gielgud Theatre
Best Set Design	Best Costume Design
Bunny Christie for Company – Gielgud Theatre; Bob Crowley for The Inheritance – Young Vic and Noël Coward Theatre; Es Devlin for The Lehman Trilogy – National Theatre Lyttelton; Anna Fleischle for Home, I'm Darling – National Theatre Dorfman and Duke of York's Theatre	Catherine Zuber for The King and I – London Palladium; Fly Davis for Caroline, or Change – Playhouse Theatre; Anna Fleischle for Home, I'm Darling – National Theatre Dorfman and Duke of York's Theatre; Gabriella Slade for Six – Arts Theatre
Best Lighting Design	Best Sound Design
Jon Clark for The Inheritance – Young Vic and Noël Coward Theatre; Neil Austin for Company – Gielgud Theatre; Howell Binkley for Come from Away – Phoenix Theatre; Lee Curran for Summer and Smoke – Almeida Theatre and Duke of York's Theatre	Gareth Owen for Come from Away – Phoenix Theatre; Paul Arditti and Christopher Reid for The Inheritance – Young Vic and Noël Coward Theatre; Mike Beer for A Monster Calls – Old Vic; Carolyn Downing for Summer and Smoke – Almeida Theatre and Duke of York's Theatre; Nick Powell for The Lehman Trilogy – National Theatre Lyttelton
Outstanding Achievement in Music
David Hein and Irene Sankoff for lyricising, scoring and writing; Ian Eisendrath for arranging and music supervising; August Eriksmoen for orchestrating; Alan Berry for music directing and music supervising and the Band for performing in Come from Away – Phoenix Theatre; Lisa Kron for lyricising and writing and Jeanine Tesori for composing Fun Home – Young Vic; Paul Englishby for composing The Inheritance – Young Vic and Noël Coward Theatre; Benji Bower for composing and performing and Will Bower for performing in A Monster Calls – Old Vic; Joe Beighton, Tom Curran, Toby Marlow and Lucy Moss for orchestrating, scoring and vocal arranging Six – Arts Theatre
Best New Dance Production	Outstanding Achievement in Dance
Blkdog by Botis Seva – Sadler's Wells; 16 + A Room/Solo Echo/Bill by Ballet British Columbia – Sadler's Wells; Playlist (Track 1, 2) by William Forsythe – English National Ballet at Sadler's Wells; The Unknown Soldier by Alastair Marriott – Royal Ballet at Royal Opera House	Akram Khan for performing in Xenos – Sadler's Wells; John MacFarlane for set designing Swan Lake – Royal Opera House; Dimitris Papaioannou for choreographing The Great Tamer – Sadler's Wells
Best New Opera Production	Outstanding Achievement in Opera
Katya Kabanova – Royal Opera House; Lessons in Love and Violence – Royal Opera House; The Turn of the Screw – Regent's Park Open Air Theatre	The Ensemble for performing in Porgy and Bess – London Coliseum; David Butt Philip and Roderick Williams for performing in War Requiem – London Coliseum; The Chorus of the English National Opera for performing in Paul Bunyan – Wilton's Music Hall; Andris Nelsons for conducting Lohengrin – Royal Opera House
Outstanding Achievement in an Affiliate Theatre
Flesh and Bone – Soho Theatre; Moe Bar-El for performing as Kareem in Every Day I Make Greatness Happen – Hampstead Theatre Downstairs; Jonathan Hyde for performing as Beau in Gently Down the Stream – Park Theatre; The Phlebotomist – Hampstead Theatre Downstairs; Athena Stevens for writing Schism – Park Theatre
Society Special Award
Matthew Bourne

== Productions with multiple wins and nominations ==
=== Multiple wins ===
The following 4 productions received multiple awards:

- 4: Come from Away, Company, The Inheritance
- 2: Summer and Smoke

=== Multiple nominations ===
The following 19 productions received multiple nominations:

- 9: Come from Away, Company
- 8: The Inheritance
- 6: The King and I
- 5: Home, I'm Darling, The Lehman Trilogy, Six, Summer and Smoke
- 3: A Monster Calls, Caroline, or Change, Fun Home, The Price, Tina
- 2: All About Eve, King Lear, The Lieutenant of Inishmore, Misty, Nine Night, Quiz

== See also ==
- 73rd Tony Awards
