= Lynn Manning =

American writer and paralympic judoka

Lynn Manning (April 30, 1955 – August 3, 2015) was an American Paralympian, playwright, poet, and actor known for his autobiographical work that explores the complexities of life as a blind African-American man.

== Biography ==
Lynn Manning's life turned upside down when he was left blind after being shot in the face in a Hollywood bar in 1978 when he was 23 years old. He made a name for himself as a playwright and actor and is best known for his semi-autobiographical work Weights, which premiered in Los Angeles in 2001. The play won three NAACP Theatre Awards, including Best Actor for Manning, and has since been performed throughout the country, including at the Theater By The Blind in New York City. Manning's last play, Up From The Downs, had its world premiere at the Los Angeles Design Center on May 7, 2005.

== Early life ==
Manning was born in Fresno, California and raised in Los Angeles. He had eight siblings. At a young age, he and his siblings were placed into foster homes. Aged 23, he lost his eyesight after being shot in the face in a Hollywood bar.

== Accomplishments ==
Lynn was a playwright, poet, actor, and former world champion of blind judo. He represented the United States at the 1988 and 1992 Summer Paralympics, where he took a silver medal in Barcelona. Lynn achieved the U.S. Olympic Committee's "Blind Male Athlete Of The Year" after winning the Blind Judo World Championship at the 1990 World Victory Games in Holland. He also won the first World Cup for blind judo in Sassari, Sardinia (Italy), in 1991. Lynn also won Silver at the 1991 Tokyo International Invitational For Blind Judo and Bronzes at The International Blind Sports Association World Championships at Colorado Springs (1995) and Madrid, Spain (1998). Weights, Manning's first story, won three theatre awards, including one for best actor. He has had 19 of his original plays produced to date. Along with Quentin Drew, he co-founded and served as artistic director for Watts Village Theater Company which brings theater to the underserved community of Watts. His poem "The Magic Wand" speaks to the intersectionality of disability and race. His poetry has appeared in many magazines and anthologies, including Staring Back: The Disability Experience from the Inside Out and Grand Passion.

== Weights ==
Manning's play "Weights" was first performed in 2000. The work illustrates his story from being a young child in poverty to his life today as a blind man writing poetry and plays and appearing in television and commercials, depicting the suffering and hard times he encountered throughout his years. Extant Theatre Company produced the UK premiere of "Weights" in 2005 and its subsequent tour. Manning appeared in Extant's tour and a further, unaffiliated production at the Millfield Theatre in London in July 2008.

== Personal life ==
Manning was divorced from his wife, Shirley. He resided in Koreatown, on the same block as McCobb Boy's home, where he lived as a youth and then worked. He was a member of Screen Actor's Guild, Actors' Equity, and The Actors Studio's West-coast Writers/Directors Unit. As a sensei of the judo program at the Braille Institute of Los Angeles, he taught martial arts to children and adults who are visually impaired. At the age of 60, he died from liver cancer on August 3, 2015.
