= The Chairs =

1952 play by Eugène Ionesco

The Chairs (French: Les Chaises) is a one-act play by Eugène Ionesco, described as an absurdist "tragic farce". It was first performed in Paris in 1952.

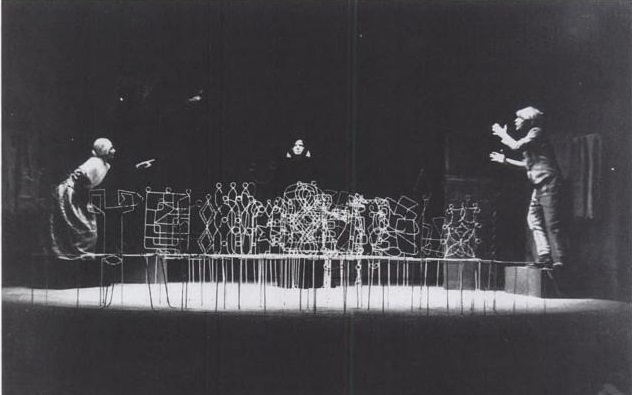
For Ionesco's Sandaliha (The Chairs), Bahman Mohasses created a number of decorative and expressive chairs that when put together suggested an abstract forest.

== Setting ==
A high tower surrounded by water.

== Characters ==
- Old Man, aged 95
- Old Woman, aged 94
- Orator, aged 45–50

== Plot summary ==
An old married couple are alone waiting for guests to arrive. The Old Man tells a favourite story from their past, and the Old Woman, who seems to be both wife and mother, says he could have been much more in life than a caretaker. He says he has a great message for mankind, and has engaged an orator to deliver it to their guests. When the guests arrive, they are invisible to the audience, yet the couple bring chairs and engage them in conversation. They include the Old Man's former lover and a photographer with whom the Old Woman flirts. The old couple tell them contradictory stories about their past lives. They frantically arrange chairs for more and more invisible guests. The room appears to be packed and the couple act as ushers. They are very excited when the Emperor arrives, also invisible. The Old Man talks with increasing grandiosity about his life and the message that he hopes will save mankind. When the Orator arrives (a real person), the old couple leap from separate windows to their deaths. The Orator tries to speak but only makes the guttural sound of a deaf-mute. He writes a few jumbled words on a blackboard, and then exits leaving only the chairs and sounds of an invisible audience.

== Analysis ==
=== Genre ===
Ionesco described the play as a "tragic farce".

Like Ionesco's earlier play The Bald Soprano (1950), The Chairs belongs to the Theatre of the Absurd, presenting a view of the world as meaningless or without purpose.

Ionesco rejected "realistic" theatre as a trick upon the audience, and instead aimed to make the spectator "participate in an act of imagination which his reason told him was 'absurd'", but which contained all the "nightmarish and contradictory absurdity" of reality.

=== Philosophical basis ===
The play addresses the philosophical idea of "the Absurd", referring to the conflict between the human tendency to seek meaning in life and the inability to find it. Ionesco suggests that "life is essentially meaningless, progress an illusion and the totality of our experience nothing but a piece of incomprehensible gobbledegook.".

The one fundamental proposition held in common by Sartre on the one hand, and by Beckett, Genet, Arrabal and Ionesco on the other, is that, at the root of consciousness, and indeed of all Being, there is a Void – un Néant – and that this Void is the point of departure for all lucidity, all experience, all 'personality' and all truth.

=== Themes ===
The most fundamental concern in The Chairs is nothingness, or the ontological void. The last moment of the play expresses this, according to Ionesco:

The chairs remain empty because there’s no one there. And at the end, the curtain falls to the accompanying noises of a crowd, while all there is on the stage is empty chairs, curtains fluttering in the wind, etc... and there's nothing. The world doesn't really exist. The subject of the play was nothingness, not failure. It was total absence, chairs without people. The world does not exist because in the future it will stop being, everything dies, you know.

One of the central motifs of the play is the couple. Ionesco explained:

The couple is the world itself, it's man and woman, Adam and Eve, the two halves of humanity who love one another, find one another, who are sick and tired of loving one another; who, in spite of everything, cannot not love one another, who cannot exist except together.

The couple are bound together by 75 years of marriage, but still disagree about simple facts such as whether they had children and whether the Old Man loved his mother. "If we cannot agree about our experience, Ionesco asks, what hope do we have of understanding the world beyond us?"

One thing the couple share is a memory of arriving at a gate into a garden, possibly Paris itself. They have tried to express it every night for 75 years. This "dream of luminosity" may represent Ionesco's idea that "the lucid perception of meaninglessness is in itself a meaningful – the only meaningful - act."

Yet the Old Man and the Old Woman are lonely where they have no right to be: in a social situation. They are trapped, and death is their only escape route.

One of Ionesco's favourite devices is to begin with an empty stage and fill it with proliferating objects. The chairs symbolise the couple's alienation from the world and their escape from the realities of old age and loneliness into a fantasy world of lies, illusions and fabrications. When the Old Woman turns into an usher, Ionesco is pointing out that theatre is also a type of illusion, and hence that "we all live in illusion".

"The Chairs may also be viewed as a self-conscious work, dealing with the situation of the dramatist and the nature of the theatrical experience itself."

=== Character ===
In Ionesco's world, the carefully constructed illusion of human logic crumbles in contradiction. "Nothing is left but an endless series of causeless and unrelated phenomena: a world of infinite coincidence". The Old Woman has been told the same story every night for 75 years, but forgets and starts again each evening with a fresh mind.

Dramatically, this amnesia "implies the total disintegration of the classical concept of character". Relationships evolve in strange permutations: the Old Woman is both wife and mother; her husband is both old man and baby. Ionesco's aim is "to create a living version of ‘reality’, sufficiently broad to encompass rational and irrational at the same time".

=== Language ===
Like Beckett, Ionesco wrote in French but was not a native French speaker. This slight alienation of thought and language developed into a primary element in his philosophy. "Language itself is an intrinsic manifestation of the absurd."

"For the purpose of demonstrating in dramatic terms the absurdity of language, Ionesco’s favourite weapon is the platitude." To reveal their absurdity, Ionesco's platitudes contradict each other, garble themselves, maintain sound but discard sense. Words seem to promise everything, but the promise in unfulfilled. The inarticulate orator takes this idea to its extreme.

In the play, the Old Man calls the Old Woman Semiramis, the name of a semi-mythical ancient Assyrian queen. This may refer to her association with the Tower of Babel.

=== Style ===
"The basic tone of The Chairs is that of bathos. The accelerating rhythm with which the guests arrive creates a sense of expectation that is deflated by the Orator’s muteness and the incomprehensibility of his written message."

The play contains many comic elements. For example, while trying to "imitate February", Ionesco's stage directions indicate that the Old Man "scratches his head like Stan Laurel". However, the play's meaninglessness only becomes meaningful if frivolity is "given a dimension of seriousness and farce one of tragedy".

== Productions ==
The play was first produced in Paris on 22 April 1952 at the Théâtre Lancry directed by Sylvain Dhomme with Paul Chevalier and Tsilla Chelton. The budget was so low that, in the hours before the premiere, Ionesco and his producer "were still trying to collect together, by appeals to friendly café-proprietors, thirty-five matching chairs of the right size and appearance". The production was revived in 1956 at the Studio des Champs-Élysées, directed by Jacques Mauclair.

The first performance in London was in May 1957 at the Royal Court Theatre directed by Tony Richardson starring George Devine and Joan Plowright. It transferred to the Phoenix Theatre off-Broadway in 1958, with Eli Wallach playing the Old Man.

In 1980 Richard Negri directed a production at the Royal Exchange, Manchester starring Gwen Nelson and Frank Thornton.

In 1989 a revival by the American Repertory Theater at the Loeb Drama Center was directed by Andrei Belgrader with Tresa Hughes, Roberts Blossom and Rodney Scott Hudson.

In 1995 and 2007 the play was produced in Mumbai, India, at the Prithvi Theatre.

In 1997 a revival at the Royal Court Theatre in London by Théâtre de Complicité was directed by Simon McBurney, starring Richard Briers and Geraldine McEwan. It transferred to the John Golden Theatre on Broadway in 1998.

In 2002, Cesear's Forum, Cleveland's small minimalist theatre at Kennedy's Down Under, Playhouse Square, OH, presented the play.

In 2004, director/choreographer David Gordon and his wife, dancer/actress Valda Setterfield, appeared in a version of the play, somewhat adapted and re-written by Gordon to the extent allowed by the Ionesco estate. This version of The Chairs was presented in London, at the Barbican Center, in Seattle, Washington, and at the Brooklyn Academy of Music in New York.

In 2006 a revival at the Gate Theatre in London was directed by Thea Sharrock, starring Susan Brown and Nicholas Woodeson.

In 2016 a revival by the Extant Theatre Company, directed by Maria Oshodi, toured the United Kingdom. The play starred Heather Gilmore and Tim Gebbels, both of whom are visually impaired actors.

In 2022 a revival at the Almeida Theatre, directed by Omar Elerian (who also produced a new translation), starred Kathryn Hunter and her husband Marcello Magni. The role of Orator, restyled as "an intrusive stage-hand" was performed by Toby Sedgwick.

In 2023 a revival was staged at the Old Fitz in Sydney, directed by Gale Edwards with Paul Capsis as the Old Woman and iOTA as the old Man. The orator was performed on a video screen by a Max Headroom-like character

On November 2, 2023, the premiere took place at the Gde Ya Theater, in Moscow. The director of the production was Sofia Stupenkova. She, together with the artist Anastasia Mitkaleva and the composer Eldar Izetov, created a chamber performance. The actors were graduates of the acting laboratory of Yuri Vitalievich Muravitsky MSHNK and actors of the Gde Ya Theater Natalia Smirnova (as the Old Man), Anastasia Vasilyeva (as Semiramis) and Marina Yagupova (as the Orator).

== Critical reaction ==
When The Chairs opened in Paris in 1952, critical reaction was less positive than to Ionesco's other early plays, perhaps because the critics expected "more wit, more verbal fireworks and less pathos", or because the production followed the text with "painstaking literalness". Professional writers, by contrast, defended the work. Jacques Audiberti described the play as "a masterpiece".

Its opening in London in 1957 was controversial, arriving soon after the realist drama Look Back in Anger, which had been praised by Kenneth Tynan, as recalled by its leading actress Joan Plowright:

Tynan expressed his dislike of Ionesco's nihilistic view that communication between human beings is impossible; and went on to chastise those who championed the playwright's evocative escape from realism. He warned that it must not be held up for emulation as the gateway to the theatre of the future. This sparked off a vigorous controversy on the merits of the Romanian-born author, and escalated into a debate on the role of the artist in society. Ionesco wrote to The Observer in his own defence, claiming a work of art has nothing to do with doctrine and saying that a critic's job was to look at it and decide whether it was true to its own nature. Devine wrote defending his author's conception of theatre as an art and Orson Welles joined in on Tynan's side, saying "an artist must confirm the values of his society; as he must challenge them". The correspondence grew larger as half of London's artistic and literary community battled it out... I found it exciting to be involved in such a hullabaloo, and of course it meant that the theatre was packed every night.

Michael Billington included The Chairs as one of his "101 Greatest Plays" on the strength of its central image of "two old people rushing about in a manic frenzy filling the stage with chairs for a set of invisible guests".
