= BTT =

BTT may refer to:

- Bhutan Time, UTC+6 hours
- Brazilian Top Team, Brazilian mixed martial arts academy
- Bettles Airport, IATA code
- Banking Transformation Toolkit, part of IBM websphere
- Banking Transaction Tax, A form of tax on cash withdrawal & other bank transactions in India
- Bayerische Theatertage, theatre festival in Germany
- Betrayal trauma theory
