= Omar Elerian =

Italian theatre director

Omar Elerian (born 1978) is an Italian theatre director and dramaturg based in London. He won the Standard Theatre Award for Best Director.

== Early life ==
Elerian was born to an Italian mother from Gorgonzola and an Egypt-born Palestinian father; his paternal grandparents fled Jaffa during the Nakba. Elerian began his studies in Milan and went on to graduate from L'École Internationale de Théâtre Jacques Lecoq.

== Career ==
With Madani Younis, Elerian co-directed The Mill: City of Dreams for Freedom Studios in 2011.

From 2012 to 2019, Elerian served as associate director of the Bush Theatre. During his time at the Bush, he direction Caroline Horton's Islands and You're Not Like The Other Girls Chrissy in 2015, Nassim Soleimanpour's NASSIM starting in 2017, Arinzé Kene's Misty starting in 2018, and Estelle Savasta's Going Through in 2019. For his work on Misty, Elerian was nominated for the Offie for Best Director.

Elerian's first project after lockdown was The Return of Danton by Mudar Alhaggi at the Munich Kammerspiele in 2021.

Back in London in 2022, Elerian directed Eugène Ionesco's The Chairs at the Almeida Theatre and Sami Ibrahim's Two Palestinians Go Dogging at the Royal Court Theatre. The latter was nominated for the Laurence Olivier Award for Outstanding Achievement in an Affiliate Theatre. His next project in 2023 was As You Like It at the Royal Shakespeare Theatre in Stratford-upon-Avon.

Elerian reunited with Soleimanpour for Echo at the Royal Court Theatre in 2024 and directed Khalid Abdalla's solo work Nowhere, which debuted at Battersea Arts Centre. In 2025, Elerian returned to the Almeida to put on his production of Ionesco's Rhinoceros. For Rhinoceros, Elerian won Best Director at the Standard Theatre Awards.
