= Wilson Milam =

Wilson Milam.

Wilson Milam is an American theatre director from Bellevue, Washington who works in the United States, UK and Ireland. He was nominated for a Tony Award for Best Director of a Play for Martin McDonagh's The Lieutenant of Inishmore as well as a Lucille Lortel nomination for his direction of Tracy Letts's Killer Joe.

== Biography ==
Milam began his career in Seattle working as an actor before moving to Chicago and getting work as an assistant director at the Victory Gardens, Remains, and Steppenwolf Theatre Companies. He directed the world premiere production of Killer Joe at the Next Theatre, which subsequently moved to the Traverse Theatre for the Edinburgh Festival, where it won a Fringe First Award, before transferring to London. A subsequent production of Lett's next play, Bug, transferred to The Gate Theatre in London and Milam began working on both sides of the Atlantic.

== Stage productions ==
US:

- Warrior Class (Alley, Houston)
- Rank (Odyssey, LA)
- American Buffalo (Seattle Rep)
- God of Carnage (Alley / Seattle Rep)
- A Perfect Future (Cherry Lane)
- Glengarry Glen Ross (Seattle Rep)
- The Lieutenant of Inishmore (Mark Taper, LA - Saturn Award - Best Production)
- The Seafarer (Seattle Rep)
- Three Changes (Playwrights Horizon)
- Poor Beast in the Rain (Matrix, LA)
- The Lieutenant of Inishmore (Lyceum / Atlantic, NYC)
- Closer (Berkeley Rep)
- Bug (Woolly Mammoth)
- Killer Joe (Soho Playhouse)
- Pot Mom (Steppenwolf)
- The Caine Mutiny Court-Martial (A Red Orchid, Chicago)
- Killer Joe (29th Street Rep, NYC)
- Skeleton (Shattered Globe, Chicago)
- Killer Joe (Next Theatre, Chicago)
- Festen (New Century Theatre Company, Seattle)

UK and Ireland:

- .45 (Hampstead)
- Swimming With Sharks (Vaudeville)
- Lay Me Down Softly (Abbey, Dublin)
- The Santaland Diaries (Birmingham Rep)
- Othello (Shakespeare's Globe)
- Harvest (Royal Court)
- Chimps (Liverpool Playhouse)
- Defender of the Faith (Abbey)
- Fresh Kills (Royal Court)
- Mr Placebo (Traverse)
- Flesh Wound (Royal Court / Galway Arts Festival)
- True West (Bristol Old Vic)
- The Lieutenant of Inishmore (RSC / Barbican / Garrick)
- On Such As We (Abbey)
- A Lie of the Mind (Donmar)
- The Wexford Trilogy (Tricycle)
- Hurlyburly (Queens / The Peter Hall Company at The Old Vic)
- Bug (Gate)
- Killer Joe (Vaudeville / Bush / Traverse)

== Film ==
In 2020, Milam directed the short film segment Congratulations on Your New Bench as part of the anthology film The Park Bench Stories.

Other:

- Doctor Who - Scream of the Shalka (BBCi)
