= Standard Theatre Award for Best Musical Performance =

Award for achievement in theatre

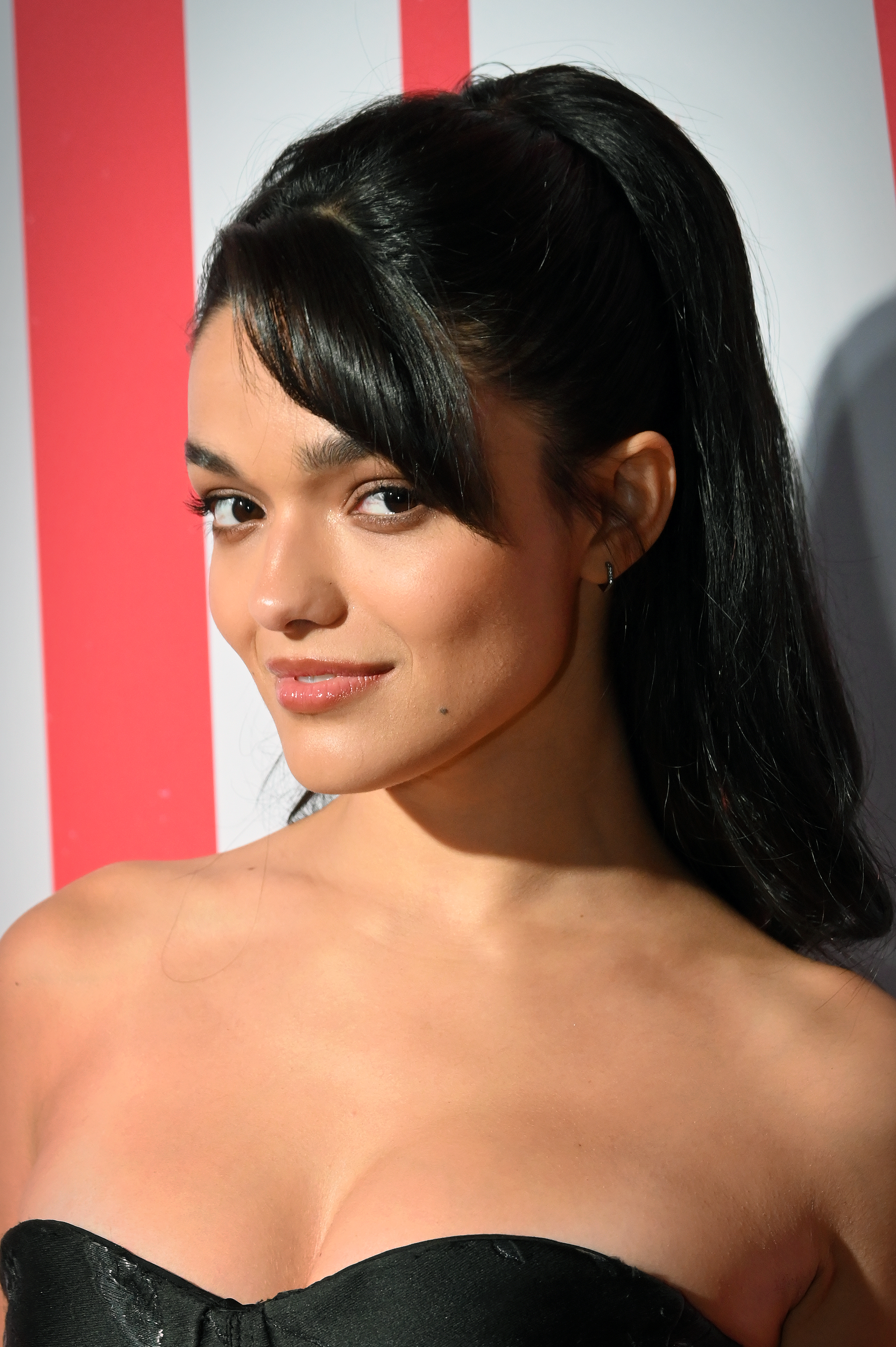
- 2025 recipient: Rachel Zegler
- Awarded for: Best Musical Performance
- Location: United Kingdom
- Presented by: The Standard
- Currently held by: Rachel Zegler for Evita (2025)

The Standard Theatre Award for Best Musical Performance is an award presented since 2013 by The Standard in recognition of achievement in London theatre.

== Winners and nominees ==
Year	Actor	Work	Character
2013
2013	Rosalie Craig	The Light Princess	The Light Princess
2013	Cynthia Erivo	The Colour Purple	Celie Harris Johnson
2013	Charlotte Wakefield	The Sound of Music	Maria von Trapp
2015
2015	Imelda Staunton	Gypsy	Mama Rose
2015	Katie Brayben	Beautiful	Carole King
2015	Rosalie Craig	City of Angels	Gabbi/Bobbi
2015	Killian Donnelly	Kinky Boots	Charlie Price
2016
2016	Glenn Close	Sunset Boulevard	Norma Desmond
2016	Andy Karl	Groundhog Day	Phil Connors
2016	Sheridan Smith	Funny Girl	Fanny Brice
2017
2017	Amber Riley	Dreamgirls	Effie White
2017	Janie Dee	Follies	Phyllis Rogers Stone
2017	Robert Fairchild	An American in Paris	Jerry Mulligan
2018
2018	Rosalie Craig	Company	Bobbie
2018	Sharon D. Clarke	Caroline, or Change	Caroline Thibodeaux
2018	Arinzé Kene	Misty	Arinzé
2018	Kelli O'Hara	The King and I	Anna Leonowens
2018	Adrienne Warren	Tina	Tina Turner
2019
2019	Anne-Marie Duff	Sweet Charity	Charity Hope Valentine
2019	Andy Nyman	Fiddler on the Roof	Teyve
2019	Sheridan Smith	Joseph and the Amazing Technicolour Dreamcoat	Narrator
2022
2022	Patrick Vaill	Oklahoma!	Jud
2022	Jessie Buckley	Cabaret	Sally Bowles
2022	Arinzé Kene	Get Up, Stand Up!	Bob Marley
2022	Sutton Foster	Anything Goes	Reno Sweeney
2022	Marisha Wallace	Oklahoma!	Ado Annie
2023
2023	Nicole Scherzinger	Sunset Boulevard	Norma Desmond
2023	Kyle Ramar Freeman	A Strange Loop	Usher
2023	Charlie Stemp	Crazy for You	Bobby Child
2023	Marisha Wallace	Guys and Dolls	Miss Adelaide
2025
2025	Rachel Zegler	Evita	Eva Perón
2025	Tracie Bennett	Here We Are	Woman
2025	Simon Lipkin	Oliver!	Fagin
2025	Andy Nyman	The Producers	Max Bialystock
2025	Vanessa Williams	The Devil Wears Prada	Miranda Priestly

== Multiple awards and nominations ==
=== Awards ===
2 awards

- Rosalie Craig

=== Nominations ===
3 nominations

- Rosalie Craig

2 nominations

- Arinzé Kene
- Andy Nyman
- Sheridan Smith
- Marisha Wallace

== See also ==
- Laurence Olivier Award for Best Actor in a Musical
- Laurence Olivier Award for Best Actress in a Musical
- Tony Award for Best Actor in a Musical
- Tony Award for Best Actress in a Musical
