= Arinzé Kene =

British actor and playwright (born 1987)

Arinzé Kene MBE
- Born: 1987 (age 38–39); Lagos, Nigeria
- Occupations: Actor, Playwright

Arinzé Mokwe Kene MBE (/əˈrɪnzeɪ ˈkɛni/) is a Nigerian-born British actor and playwright.

== Early life ==
Kene was born in Lagos, Nigeria in 1987 and moved to London when he was four. Kene's father was a taxi driver. Kene was bullied growing up and was encouraged to take kickboxing lessons. When he turned 16, he started his amateur kickboxing career and went on to win two national championships. He quit kickboxing at 21 years old and went on to pursue an acting career.

== Career ==
Kene has appeared in stage productions such as playing Simba in The Lion King, Daddy Cool, and in June 2009 played strutting lothario Raymond LeGrendre in the musical Been So Long, based on Ché Walker's 1998 play, which opened at the Young Vic. Kene also plays the lead in 2010 UK Film Council feature Freestyle. In 2010, he joined the cast of the BBC's EastEnders as Connor Stanley, for which he was nominated for Best Newcomer at the 2011 All About Soap Bubble Awards. His play Suffocation opened at the Oval House Theatre in London in 2011. Kene was also a member of the series 3 writing team for EastEnders: E20. In April 2011, his casting as Rocco in Hollyoaks was announced.

In 2013, Kene's play God's Property was a Talawa Theatre Company, Soho Theatre and Albany Theatre co-production, directed by Michael Buffong.

In 2016 he portrayed Tyler in the television series Crazyhead. From 6 October to 3 December 2016 Kene acted and sang in the role of Sam Cooke in the Donmar Warehouse production of the European premiere of One Night in Miami, a play by Kemp Powers. He also appeared opposite Beanie Feldstein and Alfie Allen in How to Build a Girl, directed by Coky Giedroyc.

In 2018, Arinzé starred in Misty, which in September transferred to Trafalgar Studios, following a sold-out run at the Bush Theatre earlier in the year. The play was written by Kene, directed by Omar Elerian and produced by Trafalgar Entertainment Group.

On 17 February 2020, it was announced that Arinzé Kene would play the role of Bob Marley in the new musical Get Up, Stand Up!, opening at the Lyric Theatre in February 2021 in London's West End, before being postponed to October 2021 due to the COVID-19 pandemic. In 2022, he received an Olivier Award nomination for Best Actor in a Musical for his performance.

In 2025 He played Walker in Michael Abbensetts play Alterations at The Royal National Theatre.

Kene was appointed Member of the Order of the British Empire (MBE) in the 2020 Birthday Honours for services to drama and screenwriting.

== Filmography ==
Year	Title	Role	Notes
2010	Glory	MMA Fighter	
2010	Freestyle	Leon	feature film
2010	Casualty	Jacob Maynard	TV series, 3 episodes
2010	EastEnders	Connor Stanley	TV series, 41 episodes
2011	Drink, Drugs and KFC	Jason Simpson	short film
2011	Hollyoaks	Rocco	TV series, 2 episodes
2013	Youngers	Ashley	TV series, 16 episodes
2014	Our Girl	Corp. Kinders	TV series, 5 episodes
2016	The Pass	Ade	feature film
2016	Fantastic Beasts and Where to Find Them	Auror 6	feature film
2016	Crazyhead	Tyler	TV series, 6 episodes
2018	Been So Long	Raymond	feature film
2018	Informer	Sal Brahimi	TV series, 6 episodes
2019	I Am...	James	TV series; Episode 3: I Am Hannah
2019	How to Build a Girl	Kenny	feature film
2019	Flack	Sam	TV series, 7 episodes
2020	I'm Your Woman	Cal	feature film
2021	Ear for Eye	UK Man	feature film
2023	Love Again	John	feature film
2023	Tuesday	Death	feature film
2024	Harvest	Phillip "Quill" Earle	feature film
2026	Up Against It	TBA	feature film

== Awards and nominations ==
=== Major associations ===
Year	Award	Category	Work	Result	Ref.
2018	Evening Standard Theatre Award	Best Musical Performance	Misty	Nominated	
2019	Laurence Olivier Award	Best New Play	Misty	Nominated	
2019	Laurence Olivier Award	Best Actor	Misty	Nominated	
2020	Laurence Olivier Award	Best Actor in a Supporting Role	Death of a Salesman	Nominated	
2022	Laurence Olivier Award	Best Actor in a Musical	Get Up, Stand Up! The Bob Marley Musical	Nominated	

=== Other awards ===
Year	Award	Category	Work	Result	Ref
2010	Offie	New Play	Estate Walls	Nominated	
2010	Offie	Most Promising New Playwright	Estate Walls	Won	
2011	Offie	New Play	Little Baby Jesus	Nominated	
2013	Offie	New Play	God's Property	Nominated	
2019	Black British Theatre Award	Best Male Actor in a Play	Misty	Won	
2019	Offie	New Play	Misty	Nominated	
2019	Offie	Performance Piece	Misty	Won	
2019	WhatsOnStage Award	Best New Play	Misty	Nominated	
2019	WhatsOnStage Award	Best Actor in a Play	Misty	Nominated	
2020	Black British Theatre Award	Best Supporting Male Actor in a Play	Death of a Salesman	Nominated	
