= Tina (musical) =

2018 jukebox musical

- The Tina Turner Musical
- Broadway promotional poster
- Music: Various
- Lyrics: Various
- Book: Katori Hall; Frank Ketelaar; Kees Prins
- Basis: Songs by Tina Turner
- Premiere: 17 April 2018: Aldwych Theatre, London
- Productions: 2018 West End; 2019 Hamburg; 2019 Broadway; 2020 Utrecht; 2021 Madrid; 2022 North American tour 2023 Sydney; 2024 North American tour 2025 UK tour 2026 São Paulo

Tina: The Tina Turner Musical is a jukebox musical featuring the music of Tina Turner and depicting her life from her humble beginnings in Nutbush, Tennessee, to her transformation into a rock 'n roll superstar. Directed by Phyllida Lloyd with a book by Katori Hall, Frank Ketelaar, and Kees Prins, the musical had its world premiere on 17 April 2018 at the Aldwych Theatre in London. The Broadway production opened on 7 November 2019.

== Synopsis ==
=== Act I ===
The musical opens with Tina preparing to go on stage, as she recites a Buddhist chant, nam myoho renge kyo.

It’s 1949 in Nutbush Tennessee, a young 9-year-old Anna Mae Bullock sings exuberantly at a community church gathering ("Nutbush City Limits"). Her mother Zelma is embarrassed at her loudness and reprimands her. Anna Mae's parents have a difficult relationship, and after being physically assaulted, Zelma walks out with her eldest daughter Alline. Anna Mae is left alone to be brought up by her grandmother, Gran Georgeanna.

Some years later, Gran Georgeanna encourages Anna Mae to go to Memphis and record an album, and Anna Mae leaves to go join her mother and sister, Alline, in St. Louis ("Don't Turn Around"). In St. Louis, Alline gives Anna Mae a makeover and introduces her to the nightlife ("Shake a Tail Feather"). At a nightclub, Anna Mae sees Ike Turner and his band, the Kings of Rhythm ("The Hunter"). Anna Mae is encouraged to sing on stage with Ike ("Matchbox" (2018–2021)/"Blood Run Cold" (2021–present)). Realizing her potential, Ike persuades Zelma to let Anna Mae join his band ("It's Gonna Work Out Fine").

Ike changes the name of the band to the "Ike and Tina Turner Revue", and gives her the stage name "Tina Turner". An attraction is sparked between Tina and Raymond Hill, the band's saxophonist. Although Tina enjoys performing with Ike and The Ikettes, she becomes increasingly aware of his vicious temper and possessiveness ("A Fool in Love"). Ike is physically violent towards her, and leaves with a female stranger. While he is gone, Raymond confesses his love for Tina, despite her attempts to end the love affair ("Let's Stay Together").

The band is refused accommodation at a motel because of their race, with Ike telling the band that the new civil rights haven't changed people's attitudes. As the band sleeps in the bus, Ike tells Tina about his father who was brutally assaulted for having a relationship with a white woman. In addition, Ike is resentful that his first hit in '58, "Rocket 88", was credited to someone else. He has Tina make a promise that she will never leave him, and asks Tina to marry him. Tina agrees, despite being pregnant with Raymond's child. As they are about to leave, two white police officers intimidate them and Ike is forced to pay them to avoid harm.

Raymond finds out about the engagement, and after warning Tina about Ike, he leaves. Rhonda Graam is introduced as the band's new manager, and Tina reveals she is pregnant with Raymond's child ("Better Be Good to Me"). As they continue touring, Tina becomes increasingly isolated from Ike as he begins taking drugs and sleeping with other women. She continues performing with Ike and his band, even while pregnant and eventually giving birth to two children, Craig and Ronnie, and still keeps performing despite Ike's infidelities, increasing violence, and demands of Tina's health ("I Want to Take You Higher"). The Ikettes leave the band because of Ike's behavior, and unsuccessfully try to convince Tina to leave as well. They introduce her to a Buddhist chant nam myoho renge kyo, to help give her strength. Rhonda admits to Tina she is only staying to help protect Tina and begs Tina to leave Ike, but she refuses because of her children.

Ike and Tina meet with Phil Spector, who offers them a recording deal. Ike is angered when Phil wants to record Tina as a solo artist. Phil guides Tina through a song he wrote for her, and Tina begins to find her "voice" ("River Deep Mountain High"). Despite the success of her new single, Ike is dismissive of Tina's ability as a solo artist. During an argument, Ike assaults her son, Craig. Tina threatens to leave Ike, but he apologizes and begs for her forgiveness ("Be Tender with Me Baby"). Tina overdoses and is sent to a hospital, but is forced to check out for a performance ("Proud Mary"). Zelma tells Tina that she must teach Ike a lesson.

Tina and Ike get into another violent fight, causing Tina to run away. Bruised and bleeding, she asks a hotel clerk for a room to stay, using only her stage name as a promise to pay later since she doesn't have any money ("I Don't Wanna Fight").

=== Act II ===
Divorced from Ike, Tina is in debt and forced to perform in Las Vegas bars with the help of Rhonda, now her manager. They're struggling to make ends meet because no record label wants to sign a black woman who's nearing forty years old, and Ike has claimed copyright over all songs from the "Ike & Tina Revue", preventing her from singing the songs she's known for ("Private Dancer").

As they drop off a demo tape at Capitol Records, they meet Roger Davies, a young Australian music producer who is a fan of Tina. Roger watches Tina perform in Las Vegas ("Disco Inferno"), and becomes her manager. Despite being upset about being put aside, Rhonda understands Tina needs to try something new. Tina tells Rhonda she needs her more as a sister, and Rhonda promises to stand by Tina's side ("Open Arms"). When Tina arrives in London, she meets Erwin Bach, who was sent to pick up Tina at the airport. Tina struggles with Roger's advice as she wants to reinvent herself. Tina feels lonely and isolated, and dreams of Ike watching her ("I Can't Stand the Rain"). Erwin comes to her hotel room and comforts her, and they share a kiss.

While preparing for a showcase for the record label, Tina becomes upset at Roger's instructions and does not want to be anyone's puppet. Tina prepares her Buddhist mantra to calm herself, and has visions of her younger self and Gran Georgeanna encouraging her ("Tonight"). Despite the showcase's success, the record label refuses to sign Tina because of her age, gender, and race. Furious, Roger quits the label and decides to promote her himself in the United States. Erwin declares his love for her and asks her to stay in London with him, but Tina rejects him. Tina successfully performs in New York City ("What's Love Got to Do with It?"). Capitol Records begs her to sign with them, but Tina agrees only on her own terms.

Alline arrives with news Zelma is dying. Tina visits Zelma at the hospital, who admits she struggled raising Tina. Ike also visits, and Zelma encourages them to reconcile. Tina is hurt her mother can't see Ike's abusive behavior, and Ike refuses to apologize. Tina and Alline mourn their mother ("We Don't Need Another Hero (Thunderdome)"). Tina realizes she is surrounded by people who form her own version of a family.

Riding high, Tina prepared for a concert in front of 180,000 people in Brazil. Roger and Tina share excitement. Erwin suddenly appears, having flown to be with her. They reconcile and share a kiss. Tina ascends the stairs for the concert ("The Best").

Encore: Tina and her band perform a mini-concert of "Nutbush City Limits" and "Proud Mary".

== Principal casts ==
Character	West End	Broadway	Hamburg	Utrecht	Madrid	North American tour	Sydney	North American tour	UK tour	São Paulo
Character	2018	2019	2019	2020	2021	2022	2023	2024	2025	2026
Tina Turner	Adrienne Warren	Adrienne Warren	Kristina Love	Nyassa Alberta	Kery Sankoh	Naomi Rodgers Zurin Villanueva	Ruva Ngwenya	Jayna Elise	Elle Ma-Kinga N'Zuzi Jochebel Ohene MaCcarthy	Analu Pimenta
Ike Turner	Kobna Holdbrook-Smith	Daniel J. Watts	Mandela Wee Wee	Juneoer Mers	Rone Reinoso	Garrett Turner	Tim Omaji	Sterling Baker-McClary	David King-Yombo	César Mello
Zelma Bullock	Madeline Appiah	Dawnn Lewis	Adisat Semenitsch	Noah Blindenburg	Juno Kotto King	Roz White	Ibinabo Jack	Elaina Walton	Letitia Hector	Renata Vilela
Erwin Bach	Gerard McCarthy	Ross Lekites	Simon Mehlich	Dieter Spileers	Oriol Anglada	Max Falls	Matthew Prime	Steven Sawan	William Beckerleg	Bruno Sigrist
Gran Georgeanna	Lorna Gayle	Myra Lucretia Taylor	Adi Wolf	Jeannine la Rose	Ileana Wilson	Ann Nesby	Deni Gordon	Deidre Lang	Claude East	Aline Cunha
Roger Davies	Ryan O’Donnell	Charlie Franklin	Nikolas Heiber	Steven Roox	Pedro Martell	Zachary Freier-Harrison	Mat Verevis	Joe Hornberger	Isaac Elder	Rodrigo Garcia
Rhonda Graam	Francesca Jackson	Jessica Rush	Sarah Schütz	Liss Walravens	Anna Lagares	Lael Van Keuren	Nadia Komazec	Kristen Daniels	Gemma Sutton	Lia Canineu
Alline Bullock	Aisha Jawando	Mars Rucker	Denise Lucia Aquino	Gaia Aikman	Aisha Fay	Parris Lewis	Jayme-Lee Hanekom	Mya Bryant	Georgia Gillam	Vanessa Mello
Phil Spector / Terry Britten	Tom Godwin	Steven Booth	Alex Bellinkx	Jasper Kerkhof	Carlos Báez	Geoffrey Kidwell	John O’Hara	Bear Manescalchi	Martin Allanson	Dante Paccola
Raymond Hill	Natey Jones	Gerald Caesar	Anthony Curtis Kirby	Owen Playfair	Yefry Xander	Taylor A. Blackman	Rishab Kern	Maurice Alpharicio	Kyle Richardson	Abrahão Costa
Richard Bullock	Natey Jones	David Jennings	Kristofer Weinstein-Storey	Marlon David Henry	Kevin Tuku	Carlton Terrence Taylor	Augie Tchantcho	Darius J. Manuel	Rushand Chambers	Samuel Conze
Carpenter / Martyn Ware	Jason Langley	Robert Lenzi	Marlon Wehmeier	Danny Houtkooper	Nico Baumgärtner	Chris Stevens	Blake Erickson	Hunter Torr	Richard Taylor Woods	Leonardo Miggiorin
Craig Hill	Kit Esuruoso	Matthew Griffin	Michael B. Sattler	Giovanni van Gom	Marcos Oli	Andre Hinds	David Mairs-McKenzie	Maurice Alpharicio	Kane Matthews	Bhener
Ronnie Turner	Baker Mukasa	Jhardon Dishon Milton	Dinipiri Etebu	Lorenzo Kolf	Hansel Moya	Antonio Beverly	Abu Kebe	Sterling Baker-McClary	Daniel N'Guessan-López	Douglas Motta

=== Notable replacements ===
West End

- Tina Turner: Nkeki Obi-Melekwe, Chanel Haynes, Aisha Jawando, Elesha Paul Moses, Kristina Love, Karis Anderson, Zoe Birkett, Fleur East
- Ike Turner: Ashley Zhangazha, Jammy Kasongo, Caleb Roberts, Okezie Morro, Rolan Bell

Broadway

- Tina Turner: Nkeki Obi-Melekwe
- Ike Turner: Nick Rashad Burroughs

1st North American tour

- Ike Turner: Roderick Lawrence

1st North American tour

- Raymond HIll: Gerard M. Williams

2nd North American tour

- Tina Turner: Meghan Dawson, Darilyn Burtley

== Musical numbers ==
Act I

- "Nutbush City Limits" (Tina Turner) - Richard, Young Tina and Company
- "Don't Turn Around" (Albert Hammond, Diane Warren) - Tina, Gran Georgeanna and Company
- "Shake a Tail Feather" (Otha Hayes, Verlie Rice, Andre Williams) - Alline, Tina, Ikettes and Company
- "The Hunter" (Booker T. Jones, C. Wells, Al Jackson, Jr., Donald Dunn, Steve Cropper) - Ike and Ronnie
- "Matchbox" (Ike Turner) - Ike, Tina and Company
- "It's Gonna Work Out Fine" (Rose Marie McCoy, Sylvia McKinney) - Zelma, Ike, Tina, Alline, Ikettes and Company
- "A Fool in Love" (I. Turner) - Tina and Ikettes
- "Let's Stay Together" (Al Green, Willie Mitchell, Jackson) - Raymond and Tina
- "Better Be Good to Me" (Holly Knight, Mike Chapman, Nicky Chinn) - Tina and Company
- "I Want to Take You Higher" (Sly Stone) - Tina, Alline and Ikettes
- "River Deep Mountain High" (Phil Spector, Jeff Barry, Ellie Greenwich) - Tina and Company
- "Be Tender with Me Baby" (Knight, Hammond,) - Ike, Tina, Alline, Ikettes, Ronnie and Richard
- "Proud Mary" (John Fogerty) - Tina, Ike, Alline and Ikettes
- "I Don't Wanna Fight" (Lulu, Billy Lawrie, Steve DuBerry) - Tina and Company

Act II

- "Private Dancer" (Mark Knopfler) - Tina
- "Disco Inferno" (Leroy Green, Ron Kersey) - Tina and Company
- "Open Arms" (Martin Brammer, Colette van Sertima, Ben Barson) - Rhonda, Tina and Company
- "I Can't Stand the Rain" (Ann Peebles, Don Bryant, Bernard Miller) - Tina, Ike and Company
- "Tonight" (David Bowie, Iggy Pop) - Young Tina, Gran Georgeanna, Tina and Roger
- "What's Love Got to Do with It?" (Terry Britten, Graham Lyle) - Tina, Ikettes, Ronnie and Raymond
- "We Don't Need Another Hero (Thunderdome)" (Britten, Lyle) - Tina and Company
- "The Best" (Knight, Chapman) - Tina and Company
- "Finale: "Nutbush City Limits (Reprise)" (T. Turner) / Proud Mary (Reprise)" (Fogerty) - Company

Songwriters in parentheses

In the Broadway production "Rocket 88" replaced "The Hunter" and "She Made My Blood Run Cold" was included after "Matchbox". Beginning in 2021, the same change was made to the West End production.

== Background ==
On 16 December 2016 a workshop presentation was held with Tina Turner in attendance, announcing that a biographical musical about Tina's life had been in development by Stage Entertainment for over a year. The creative team of the musical consists of Katori Hall, with Frank Ketelaar and Kees Prins as writers of the book, Phyllida Lloyd as the director, Mark Thompson as set and costume designer, Anthony van Laast as choreographer and Nicholas Skilbeck as musical supervisor. Frank Ketelaar and Kees Prins wrote the early draft of the book, with Katori Hall taking over partway through development.

== Productions ==
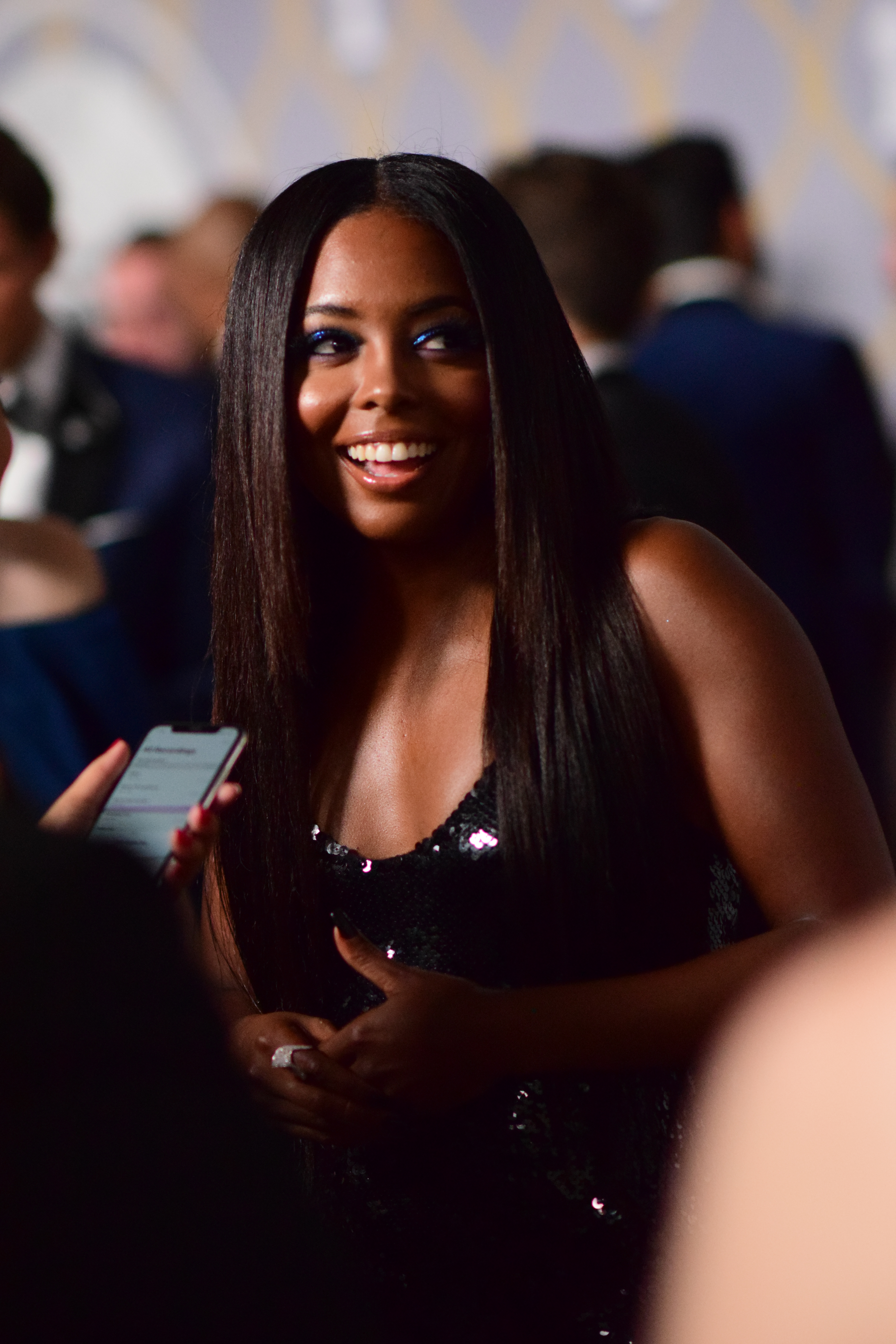
Adrienne Warren portrayed Tina Turner in the West End and Broadway productions of Tina

=== West End (2018–2025) ===
The show began previews on 21 March 2018 at the Aldwych Theatre, officially opened on 17 April. Adrienne Warren played the title role, with Jenny Fitzpatrick alternating in the role in some performances. The production was nominated for three Laurence Olivier Awards, including Best Musical. After Warren's departure, the title role was played by Nkeki Obi-Melekwe, Chanel Haynes, Aisha Jawando, Elesha Paul Moses, Kristina Love, Karis Anderson, Zoe Birkett, and Fleur East. The show closed on 13 September 2025, having played over 2,400 performances.

=== Germany (2019–2024) ===
The first non-English production opened in March 2019 at the Stage Operettenhaus in Hamburg, Germany. In March 2023, the German production was transferred to the Apollo Theater Stuttgart. The musical closed in Stuttgart on September 22, 2024.

=== Broadway (2019–2022) ===
The show began on Broadway in previews at the Lunt-Fontanne Theatre on 12 October 2019 and officially opened on 7 November 2019. Warren reprised the title role in the Broadway production, with direction by Phyllida Lloyd and choreography by Anthony van Laast. The show was suspended on 12 March 2020 due to the COVID-19 pandemic and resumed performances on 8 October 2021. In June 2022, it was announced that the production would close on 14 August 2022 after 27 previews and 482 regular performances.

=== Netherlands (2020–2023) ===
On 9 February 2020, the show opened at the Beatrix theater in Utrecht, the Netherlands. After the suspension of the show a little more than a month after its opening, performances resumed on 14 July 2021. The show closed in February 2023.

=== Spain (2021–2023) ===
A Spanish production ran from 30 September 2021 to January 8, 2023 at the Teatro Coliseum in Madrid.

=== North American tour (2022–2024) ===
On 11 September 2022, the show embarked on a North American tour opening at the Providence Performing Arts Center (PPAC) in Providence, Rhode Island, and closing on 4 August 2024 at the Proctor's Theatre in Schenectady, New York.

=== Australia (2023–2025) ===
An Australian production opened in May 2023 at the Theatre Royal, Sydney. This production toured Australia, ending in the Princess Theatre, Melbourne in March 2025.

=== North American tour (2024–2026) ===
A non-equity tour kicked off on 24 September 2024, at the E. J. Thomas Hall in Akron, Ohio, starring American Idol finalist Jayna Elise, and closed on 19 April 2026, at the Hollywood Pantages Theatre in Los Angeles. The Mexican leg of the tour included stops in Monterrey (from 12 to 14 December 2025) and Mexico City (from 16 to 21 December 2025).

=== UK and international tour (2025–2026) ===
An UK and international tour started on 6 March 2025, at the Curve Theatre, Leicester, and closed on 3 May 2026 at Theater 11, Zürich.

=== Brazil (2026) ===
A Brazilian production ran from 26 February to July 12 2026 at the Teatro Santander in São Paulo. The production kept some songs intact, while others were translated into Portuguese. Cast included Analu Pimenta as Tina, César Mello as Ike Turner, Renata Vilela as Zelma, Aline Cunha as Georgeanna, Bruno Sigrist as Erwin Bach, and Carol Roberto as alternate Tina.

== Critical response ==
The musical received generally positive reviews from the critics, with particular praise reserved for Adrienne Warren in the title role as Tina Turner. Michael Billington of The Guardian described the "whirlwind performance" of Warren as "astonishing", and concluded on the production: "As bio-musicals go, this is as good as it gets." Similarly Dominic Cavendish of The Daily Telegraph described Warren's performance as a "tour de force" and considered the show "slickly choreographed, beautifully designed and roof-raisingly well-sung". Adam Mattera in Echoes noted "the production plays fast and loose with catalogue chronology... it's a crowd-pleasing decision meaning all the solo mega-hits aren't squeezed into the final act, but simultaneously it derails the dramatic reveal of Tina's 80s rock'n'roll reinvention," while concluding "it's so resounding joyous you don't care."

Will Gompertz of the BBC criticised the script as "rather disappointingly two-dimensional", but thought the musical "elegantly staged" with Warren a "24-carat, all singing, all dancing, bona fide star". Stephen Dalton of The Hollywood Reporter noted that while its grand finale contains "stilted, corny elements", "the production becomes a full-blooded rock show that is "roof-raising" and "life-affirming", with a climax that "swept the crowd to its feet. Pure button-pushing melodrama, maybe. But irresistibly uplifting entertainment, too."

== Awards and nominations ==
=== Original West End production ===
Year	Award	Category	Nominee	Result
2018	Evening Standard Theatre Award	Best Musical Performance	Adrienne Warren	Nominated
2018	Evening Standard Theatre Award	Best Director	Phyllida Lloyd	Nominated
2018	Stage Debut Award	Best West End Debut	Adrienne Warren	Nominated
2019	Laurence Olivier Award	Best New Musical		Nominated
2019	Laurence Olivier Award	Best Actress in a Musical	Adrienne Warren	Nominated
2019	Laurence Olivier Award	Best Actor in a Musical	Kobna Holdbrook-Smith	Won
2019	Black British Theatre Award	Best Musical Production		Nominated
2019	Black British Theatre Award	Best Male Actor in a Musical	Kobna Holdbrook-Smith	Nominated
2019	WhatsOnStage Award	Best New Musical		Nominated
2019	WhatsOnStage Award	Best Actress in a Musical	Adrienne Warren	Nominated
2019	WhatsOnStage Award	Best Actor in a Musical	Kobna Holdbrook-Smith	Nominated
2019	WhatsOnStage Award	Best Show Poster		Nominated
2020	Black British Theatre Award	Best Musical		Nominated
2020	Black British Theatre Award	Best Female Actor in a Musical	Aisha Jawando	Nominated

=== Original Broadway production ===
Year	Award	Category	Nominee	Result
2020	Tony Awards	Best Musical		Nominated
2020	Tony Awards	Best Book of a Musical	Katori Hall, Frank Ketelaar and Kees Prins	Nominated
2020	Tony Awards	Best Performance by a Leading Actress in a Musical	Adrienne Warren	Won
2020	Tony Awards	Best Performance by a Featured Actor in a Musical	Daniel J. Watts	Nominated
2020	Tony Awards	Best Performance by a Featured Actress in a Musical	Myra Lucretia Taylor	Nominated
2020	Tony Awards	Best Direction of a Musical	Phyllida Lloyd	Nominated
2020	Tony Awards	Best Choreography	Anthony Van Laast	Nominated
2020	Tony Awards	Best Orchestrations	Ethan Popp	Nominated
2020	Tony Awards	Best Scenic Design of a Musical	Mark Thompson and Jeff Sugg	Nominated
2020	Tony Awards	Best Costume Design of a Musical	Mark Thompson	Nominated
2020	Tony Awards	Best Lighting Design of a Musical	Bruno Poet	Nominated
2020	Tony Awards	Best Sound Design of a Musical	Nevin Steinberg	Nominated
2020	Drama Desk Awards	Outstanding Actress in a Musical	Adrienne Warren	Won
2020	Drama Desk Awards	Outstanding Costume Design of a Musical	Mark Thompson	Nominated
2020	Drama Desk Awards	Outstanding Lighting Design of a Musical	Bruno Poet	Nominated
2020	Drama Desk Awards	Outstanding Wig and Hair Design	Campbell Young Associates	Won
2020	Drama League Awards	Outstanding Production of a Musical		Nominated
2020	Drama League Awards	Distinguished Performance Award	Adrienne Warren	Nominated
2020	Outer Critics Circle Awards	Outstanding New Broadway Musical		Honoree
2020	Outer Critics Circle Awards	Outstanding Choreographer	Anthony Van Laast	Honoree
2020	Outer Critics Circle Awards	Outstanding Actress in a Musical	Adrienne Warren	Honoree
2020	Outer Critics Circle Awards	Outstanding Featured Actor in a Musical	Daniel J. Watts	Honoree
2020	Outer Critics Circle Awards	Outstanding Costume Design	Mark Thompson	Honoree
2022	Chita Rivera Awards	Outstanding Female Dancer in a Broadway Show	Adrienne Warren	Nominated
