= Estelle Savasta =

French playwright and theatre director

Estelle Savasta is a French playwright and theatre director. She runs the theatre company Hippolyte a mal au cœur. Her first play Seule dans ma peau d’âne was critically acclaimed. Her second play Traversée has been translated into English as Going Through and was staged at the Bush Theatre in London in 2019.
