= Eugenius! =

Eugenius! The Musical
- The Eunique Musical
- Logo for The Other Palace production
- Music: Ben Adams; Chris Wilkins
- Lyrics: Ben Adams; Chris Wilkins
- Book: Ben Adams; Chris Wilkins
- Premiere: 29 June 2016: London Palladium
- Productions: 2018 London Palladium concert 2018 Off-West End; 2023 Turbine Theatre, Battersea

Eugenius! is an original musical comedy featuring book, music and lyrics by Ben Adams and Chris Wilkins.

== Production history ==
=== London Palladium concert (2016) ===
After two years of extensive workshops with the writers and original creatives, the musical had its world premiere as a concert performance at the London Palladium on 29 June 2016, produced by Kevin Wood, George Wood and Warwick Davis (who also starred as Evil Lord Hector). The concert also featured Marcus Brigstocke as the narrator. The concert was choreographed by Aaron Renfree, and Directed by Ian Talbot with Musical Direction from Nathan Jarvis.

=== Off-West End (2018) ===
A fully staged production received its premiere at The Other Palace in London from 22 January to 3 March 2018, returning for a second run from 1 September to 7 October 2018, before being extended until 21 October 2018, starring Rob Houchen in the leading role of Eugene & Laura Baldwin as Janey. The production was choreographed by Aaron Renfree directed by Ian Talbot, assisted by the shows writer Chris Wilkins with Michael Jibson serving as a creative consultant. The show gained a cult following from an audience of fans of all ages who were hooked on the catchy tunes and funny script.

Following the run at The Other Palace, a transfer was planned for a limited 10-week season at the Ambassadors Theatre in London's West End from 27 October 2018 to 7 January 2019, however it was later announced that this would not be happening.

=== Turbine Theatre revival (2023) ===
The musical was revived at the Turbine Theatre in Battersea, London from 23 March to 28 May 2023 directed by Hannah Chissick.

== Cast and characters ==
Character	London Palladium Concert	Off-West End		Recording Artist	Battersea revival
Character	2016	Jan 2018	Sep 2018	2019	2023
Eugene	Louis Maskell	Liam Forde	Rob Houchen	Ben Adams	Elliott Evans
Janey	Amy Lennox	Laura Baldwin	Laura Baldwin	Amy Lennox	Jaina Brock-Patel
Feris	Daniel Buckley	Daniel Buckley	Daniel Buckley	Daniel Buckley	James Hameed
Evil Lord Hector	Warwick Davis	Ian Hughes	Neil McDermott	Warwick Davis	Joseph Beach
Theo	Samuel Holmes	Scott Paige	Scott Paige	Scott Paige	Rhys Taylor
Lex	David Bedella	Cameron Blakely	Alex Bourne	Michael Jibson	Lara Denning
Carrie/Super Hot Lady	Summer Strallen	Melissa James	Emily Tierney	Joanne Clifton	Maddison Firth
Gerhard/Tough Man	Shaun Dalton	Shaun Dalton	Simon Thomas	Shaun Dalton	Dominic Andersen
Space Diva/Mrs Truthstretcher		Alison Arnopp	Alison Arnopp	Sharon D. Clarke	Rhys Taylor / Lara Denning
Space Lord	Brian Blessed (voice)	Brian Blessed (voice)	Brian Blessed (voice)	Brian Blessed (voice)	
Narrator	Marcus Brigstocke	Marcus Brigstocke	Marcus Brigstocke	Marcus Brigstocke	
