= The Inheritance (play) =

2018 American play by Matthew Lopez

- Cover to the ebook script, based on the original poster for the Young Vic production
- Original language: English
- Written by: Matthew López
- Based on: Inspired by Howards End by E. M. Forster
- Subject: Early AIDS crisis, generational trauma, queer culture
- Setting: New York City; Upstate New York

Premiere
- Date: March 28, 2018
- Place: Young Vic, London
- Directed by: Stephen Daldry

The Inheritance is a play by Matthew López, inspired by the 1910 novel Howards End by E. M. Forster. The play premiered in London at the Young Vic in March 2018, before transferring to Broadway in November 2019.

== Productions ==
=== Off-West End (2018) ===
The play was commissioned by Hartford Stage in Hartford, Connecticut. The play was produced in London at the Young Vic Theatre under the direction of Stephen Daldry in March 2018. The play was staged in two parts of over three hours each, intended to be viewed sequentially, and reimagines E. M. Forster's Howards End as "a lovingly wry portrait of New York's gay community", "with gay men from different generations standing in for Forster's straight people from different classes". Lopez found parallels between his own life and Forster's closeted existence before the partial-decriminalisation of homosexuality, telling The New Yorker: "We're so far apart, and yet when I read his diaries—that’s me. That's me, a hundred years ago, as a closeted white man in England". Lopez has described that the greatest theatrical influence, despite comparisons with Tony Kushner's Angels in America as being Gatz, Elevator Repair Service's 2-part, 8-hour adaptation of The Great Gatsby, inspiring his use of "self-narration".

The Inheritance examines love between gay men in contemporary New York a generation after the early AIDS crisis. It asks what the current generation owes to its forebears with Rebecca Read writing in The New Yorker that lead character Eric Glass, "as the grandson of Holocaust survivors, has a personal connection to generational catastrophe, and is therefore better primed to comprehend the history of the gay community’s devastation".

=== West End (2018) ===
The production transferred to the Noël Coward Theatre in London's West End on September 21, 2018 and was produced by Tom Kirdahy, Sonia Friedman, and Hunter Arnold.

The Inheritance won Best Play at the London Evening Standard Theatre Award 2018. The Inheritance also won Best New Play, Best Director for Stephen Daldry and Best Actor for Kyle Soller at both the 2019 Critics' Circle Theatre Awards and the 2019 Laurence Olivier Awards, also winning an Olivier for Best Lighting for Jon Clark.

=== Broadway (2019–2020) ===
The play premiered on Broadway at the Ethel Barrymore Theatre on September 27, 2019 in previews, with the official opening on November 17. The production features Lois Smith as Margaret, with Kyle Soller and John Benjamin Hickey, among others, reprising their roles from the London production.

In December 2019, it was announced that Tony Goldwyn would replace Hickey for a four-month stint beginning in January 2020, while Hickey was set to direct a revival of Plaza Suite. However, in February 2020, it was announced that The Inheritance would close on March 15, after 46 previews and 138 regular performances. On March 12, the final four performances were cancelled when all Broadway theatres closed to combat the COVID-19 pandemic.

=== Other notable productions ===
A German language production of The Inheritance titled Das Vermächtnis, directed by Philip Stölzl, premiered at Munich's Residenztheater on January 30, 2022. The production was invited to the Berliner Theatertreffen as one of ten "noteworthy" productions of 2022. Das Vermächtnis also premiered in Hanover on April 22, 2022, as well as at the Theater Münster on December 3, 2022 and most recently at the E.T.A.-Hoffmann-Theater in Bamberg on October 6, 2023. Part one of the Bamberg production was invited to the Bayerische Theatertage in 2024.

In 2022, The Inheritance received its first major regional production in the United States when SpeakEasy Stage Company presented the play at the Stanford Calderwood Pavilion at the Boston Center for the Arts, running from April 22 to June 11, 2022. The production was directed by Paul Daigneault, with movement and intimacy direction by Yo-EL Cassell, and featured scenic design by Cristina Todesco, costume design by Charles Schoonmaker, lighting design by Karen Perlow, and original sound and music by Dewey Dellay. In a review for The Boston Globe, the production was described as an ambitious and emotionally resonant staging that emphasized the play’s exploration of intergenerational memory, community, and the enduring impact of the AIDS crisis. The production received eight Elliot Norton Award nominations, receiving three awards: Outstanding Play - Midsize Theater, Outstanding Featured Performance - Midsize Theater (Mishka Yarovoy), and Outstanding Ensemble.

A West Coast premiere production directed by Mike Donahue opened at the Geffen Playhouse on September 13, 2022, and had an extended run until November 27, 2022. The play was cited as "better in Los Angeles than on Broadway" by Los Angeles Times theater critic Charles McNulty. An audio adaptation was later released by Audible Theater in March 2023.

ARV, the Swedish version of The Inheritance had its premiere on November 5, 2022, at The Royal Dramatic Theatre in Stockholm. It was chosen to be part of the theatre biennale 2023 and won the Nöjesguiden award for best performance 2023 and was nominated for a QX-award for best production 2023. It ran again in 2024/2025 in a partly new version at The Royal Dramatic Theatre. ARV was directed by Carl Johan Karlson.

Brazilian Portuguese language production of The Inheritance, called A Herança, premiered at Teatro Vivo, São Paulo, on March 9, 2023, and ran until April 30, 2023. The play was translated into Portuguese by Zé Henrique de Paula, who also directs and produces it. Bruno Fagundes, the other local producer, performs the role of Eric Glass in the Brazilian version. Due to its success, a new season, this time placed at Teatro Raul Cortez, São Paulo, premiered on June 1, 2023, and ran until July 30, 2023.

A Danish language production of The Inheritance named Arven premiered at the Royal Danish Playhouse March 25, 2023 and ran until May 13 the same year. The production was staged by Thomas Bendixen. The production won the 2023 Reumert Award for Best Performance. The production opened again August 24, 2024 as part of the Royal Danish Theatre's 2024-25 season and yet again August 22, 2026 as part of its 2026/2027 season.

In April 2023, Canadian Stage announced that, as part of its 2023-24 season, it would stage a production in Toronto. The production was directed by Brendan Healy, Canadian Stage's artistic director, and ran at the Bluma Appel Theatre, Front Street East, Toronto in March and April 2024.

In January 2024, The Inheritance had its Australian premiere at Melbourne's fortyfivedownstairs in a production directed by Kitan Petkovski.

A Norwegian production of The Inheritance named Arven, like in Denmark, ran from February 8 to May 31, 2025 at Nationaltheatret in Oslo.

A Catalan language production entitled L'herència was staged at Teatre Lliure in Barcelona, and it ran from February 20 to March 16, 2025 and it was directed by Josep Maria Mestres.

In August 2025, The Inheritance made its Washington D.C. regional debut at Round House Theatre, directed by Tom Story. The production—which features the first presidential election of Donald Trump in 2016—drew attention for its proximity to the capital during the first year of Trump's second term.

== Cast and characters ==
Role	Off-West End	West End	Broadway	Boston	Los Angeles	Toronto	Australian Premiere	Oslo	Washington, D.C. Regional
Role	2018		2019	2022	2022	2024	2024	2025	
Eric Glass	Kyle Soller	Kyle Soller	Kyle Soller	Eddie Shields	Adam Kantor	Qasim Khan	Charles Purcell	Vetle Bergan	David Gow
Toby Darling	Andrew Burnap	Andrew Burnap	Andrew Burnap	Jared Reinfeldt	Juan Castano	Antoine Yared	Tomáš Kantor	Olav Waastad	Adam Poss
Adam / Leo	Samuel H. Levine	Samuel H. Levine	Samuel H. Levine	Mishka Yarovoy	Nicholas L. Ashe	Stephen Jackman-Torkoff	Karl Richmond	Alfred Ekker Strande	Jordi Bertán Ramírez
Walter / Morgan	Paul Hilton	Paul Hilton	Paul Hilton	Mark H. Dold	Bill Brochtrup	Daniel MacIvor	Dion Mills	Geir Kvarme	Robert Sella
Henry Wilcox	John Benjamin Hickey	John Benjamin Hickey	John Benjamin Hickey	Dennis Trainor Jr.	Tuc Watkins	Jim Mezon	Hunter Perske	Eindride Eidsvold	Robert Gant
Jasper	Hugo Bolton	Hugo Bolton	Kyle Harris	Greg Maraio	Kasey Mahaffy	Salvatore Antonio	Joss McClelland	Karl-Vidar Lende	Hunter Ringsmith
Toby's Agent	Robert Boulter	Robert Boulter	Jonathan Burke	Kees Hoekendijk	Eddie Lopez	Gregory Prest	Christian Taylor	Jacob Jensen	Ben Bogen
Young Henry	Hubert Burton	Hubert Burton	Carson McCalley	Travis Doughty	August Gray Gall	Ben Page	Alexander Thew	Gorm Grømer	Cole Sitilides
Tristan	Syrus Lowe	Syrus Lowe	Jordan Barbour	Brandon Curry	Jay Donnell	Hollywood Jade	Javon King	Yusuf Toosh Ibra / Christoffer R. Masters	Jamar Jones
Jason 1	Michael Marcus	Michael Marcus	Darryl Gene Daughtry Jr.	Benjamín Cardona	Israel Erron Ford	Aldrin Bundoc	Iopu Auva’a	Eirik Langås Jørgensen	Jonathan Atkinson
Young Walter	Luke Thallon	Jack Riddiford	Dylan Frederick	Jo Michael Rezes	Miguel Pinzon	Landon Nesbitt	Rupert Bevan	Ulrik William Græsli	Dylan Toms
Jason 2	Michael Walters	Michael Walters	Arturo Luís Soria	Ricardo "Ricky" Holguin	Avi Roque	Breton Lalama	Juan Gomez	Hermann Sabado	John Floyd
Margaret	Vanessa Redgrave	Vanessa Redgrave	Lois Smith	Paula Plum	Tantoo Cardinal	Louise Pitre	Jillian Murray	Liv Bernhoft Osa	Nancy Robinette

=== Notable replacements ===
==== Broadway (2019–2020) ====
- Henry Wilcox: Tony Goldwyn

== Critical response ==
Theatre critic Dominic Cavendish, writing for The Daily Telegraph, called The Inheritance “perhaps the most important American play of this century so far.” Variety ‘s Matt Trueman considered the play to be a "vast, imperfect and unwieldy masterpiece that unpicks queer politics and neoliberal economics anew. In addressing the debt gay men owe to their forebears, it dares to ask whether the past hasn’t also sold the present up short."

Michael Billington, in his review for The Guardian, gave The Inheritance four out of five stars. According to him: “Daldry’s crystalline production pierces your emotional defences, raises any number of political issues and enfolds you in its narrative.” He admired the “rollercoaster energy and high entertainment value” of the play, but “found its exclusive maleness limiting” given that “the only woman we meet does not appear until the end.” On occasion, he also felt that “Lopez was exhibiting his own virtuosity at the expense of [a] character’s believability.” In a later article, Billington praised Paul Hilton's performance in the play. The Inheritance placed 15th on The Guardian's list of the 50 greatest theatre shows since 2000.

The show received mostly mixed reviews on Broadway. Ben Brantley from The New York Times praised the cast performances and noted the continued experiential relevance of the AIDS crises, but felt that “the breadth doesn't always translate into depth." Writing in The New Yorker, Rebecca Mead described The Inheritance as "less intellectually demanding" and "strik[ing] an upper-middlebrow tone" as compared to Tony Kushner’s Angels in America which also explores similar themes within the context of the AIDS crisis.

Terrence McNally, author of the 1994 play Love! Valour! Compassion!, which offers a contemporary take on the AIDS crisis, said that "as an 80-year-old survivor, observer, and participant of the many years covered in the play" he had never had such a strong response, referring to the experience of watching a play about the early AIDS crisis amid an audience of gay men of both the survivors' generation and the subsequent generation, that of the protagonists.

== Awards and nominations ==
=== Original London production ===
Year	Award	Category	Nominee	Result
2018	Evening Standard Theatre Award	Best Play	Matthew Lopez	Won
2018	Evening Standard Theatre Award	Best Actor	Kyle Soller	Nominated
2018	Evening Standard Theatre Award	Best Director	Stephen Daldry	Nominated
2018	Critics' Circle Theatre Award	Best New Play	Matthew Lopez	Won
2018	Critics' Circle Theatre Award	Best Actor	Kyle Soller	Won
2018	Critics' Circle Theatre Award	Best Director	Stephen Daldry	Won
2019	Laurence Olivier Award	Best New Play		Won
2019	Laurence Olivier Award	Best Actor	Kyle Soller	Won
2019	Laurence Olivier Award	Best Actress in a Supporting Role	Vanessa Redgrave	Nominated
2019	Laurence Olivier Award	Best Director	Stephen Daldry	Won
2019	Laurence Olivier Award	Best Set Design	Bob Crowley	Nominated
2019	Laurence Olivier Award	Best Lighting Design	Jon Clark	Won
2019	Laurence Olivier Award	Best Sound Design	Paul Arditti and Christopher Reid	Nominated
2019	Laurence Olivier Award	Outstanding Achievement in Music	Paul Englishby	Nominated
2019	South Bank Sky Arts Award	Theatre		Won

=== Original Broadway production ===
Year	Award	Category	Nominee	Result
2020	Tony Award	Best Play		Won
2020	Tony Award	Best Performance by a Leading Actor in a Play	Andrew Burnap	Won
2020	Tony Award	Best Performance by a Featured Actor in a Play	John Benjamin Hickey	Nominated
2020	Tony Award	Best Performance by a Featured Actor in a Play	Paul Hilton	Nominated
2020	Tony Award	Best Performance by a Featured Actress in a Play	Lois Smith	Won
2020	Tony Award	Best Direction of a Play	Stephen Daldry	Won
2020	Tony Award	Best Original Score	Paul Englishby	Nominated
2020	Tony Award	Best Scenic Design of a Play	Bob Crowley	Nominated
2020	Tony Award	Best Costume Design of a Play	Bob Crowley	Nominated
2020	Tony Award	Best Lighting Design of a Play	Jon Clark	Nominated
2020	Tony Award	Best Sound Design of a Play	Paul Arditti and Christopher Reid	Nominated
2020	Drama Desk Award	Outstanding Play		Won
2020	Drama Desk Award	Outstanding Actor in a Play	Kyle Soller	Nominated
2020	Drama Desk Award	Outstanding Featured Actor in a Play	Paul Hilton	Won
2020	Drama Desk Award	Outstanding Featured Actress in a Play	Lois Smith	Won
2020	Drama Desk Award	Outstanding Director of a Play	Stephen Daldry	Won
2020	Drama Desk Award	Outstanding Sound Design of a Play	Paul Arditti and Christopher Reid	Won
2020	Drama League Award	Outstanding Production of a Play		Won
2020	Drama League Award	Distinguished Performance	Paul Hilton	Nominated
2020	New York Drama Critics' Circle Award	Best Play	Matthew López	Finalist
2020	Outer Critics Circle Award	Outstanding New Broadway Play		Honoree
2020	Outer Critics Circle Award	Outstanding Director of a Play	Stephen Daldry	Honoree
2020	Outer Critics Circle Award	Outstanding Featured Actor in a Play	John Benjamin Hickey	Honoree
2020	Outer Critics Circle Award	Outstanding Featured Actor in a Play	Paul Hilton	Honoree
2020	Outer Critics Circle Award	Outstanding Featured Actor in a Play	Samuel H. Levine	Honoree
2020	Outer Critics Circle Award	Outstanding Featured Actress in a Play	Lois Smith	Honoree
2020	GLAAD Media Award	Outstanding Broadway Production		Won

== See also ==
- The Whipping Man
