= Extant Theatre Company =

Extant is the only UK-based performing arts company run by, and for, visually-impaired people. The company was founded in 1997 and is led by blind Artistic Director and CEO, Maria Oshodi. It produces a range of work for national and international touring, with an office base at Ovalhouse theatre in South London.

In April 2016 they toured a production of The Chairs by Eugene Ionesco, in translation by Martin Crimp. This was a revival of the company's previous staging of the play in 2014, directed by Maria Oshodi supported by assistant director Julie Osman. For this production, Extant employed two visually-impaired actors in the roles of Old Man and Old Woman, and used live audio description as part of an innovative sound design to create a dynamic, shared experience for visually-impaired and sighted members of its audiences. The show received positive critical reception, twice mentioned in the Guardian's top theatre picks. It toured to venues in Harlow, Birmingham, Manchester and Stratford, London throughout April 2016.

As a National Portfolio Organisation, Extant receives Arts Council funding to produce theatre work, and develop nationwide participation opportunities for people in different areas of the UK, often partnering with other sight loss charities. Workshops are run by visually-impaired facilitators predominantly in London and the Midlands (Birmingham and Manchester). They span from grass-roots level drama skills to further training for emerging and professional artists with visual impairment.

Previous projects have included a diverse range of theatre, dance, creative writing and inter-generational sharing activities. The company is concerned with innovating access for audiences and engages in the creative development of audio description. The experimental nature of Extant's work was previously developed in the 2015 project 'Flatland: an adventure in many dimensions', working with researchers at Yale and the Open University to create an immersive theatrical experience using haptic technology.

== Productions ==
- The Chairs (2016)
- ComBUStion (2015)
- Flight Paths (Research and Development - ongoing)
- Show Real Miracles (2015)
- Flatland (Research and Development, 2014–15)
- I Dance (2014)
- The Chairs (2014)
- ZombieyeZ in Zagreb (2013)
- Radio Play (2013)
- Forum4Us (2012)
- Sheer (2012)
- Tandemonium (2010)
- Obscurity (2009)
- Effing and Blinding! Cabaret (2007–2009)
- Weights (2005)
- Resistance (2005)
- Zeros and Nils (2002)
