= Maria Oshodi =

British writer and theatre director (born 1964)

Maria Oshodi (born 1964) is a British writer and theatre director. A guide dog owner, she is Artistic director and CEO of Extant Theatre Company, Britain's only professional performing arts company of blind and partially sighted people.

== Life ==
Maria Oshodi was born in South London in 1964.

Oshodi's play The 'S' Bend was chosen for the Young Writers' Festival at the Royal Court Festival in 1984. Produced by the Cockpit Youth Theatre in 1985, it was chosen for the first International Festival of Young Playwrights, Interplay '85, held in Sydney.

Blood, Sweat and Fears, a play treating sickle cell anaemia, was written in response to a request from a worker at the Sickle Cell Centre in Lambeth. Ben is a fast-food worker who has sickle cell anaemia, but resists pressure from his girlfriend Ashley to label himself as disabled. Once hospitalized, he has to attempt agency within a health-care system that is ill-informed and discriminatory. The play was first presented by Harmony Arts at the Battersea Arts Centre, with Steven Woodcock playing Ben and Winsome Pinnock also in the cast, before touring England.

Maria was the inspiration for one of the main characters in theatre maker Sheila Hill's 1995 work, Crocodile Looking At Birds, Lyric Hammersmith.

== Plays ==
- The 'S' Bend. Longman, 1986.
- Blood, Sweat and Fears. Methuen, 1989.
