= Liam Steel =

New Zealand rugby union player (born 1991)

- Born: 18 May 1991 (age 35) New Zealand
- Height: 1.83 m (6 ft 0 in)
- Weight: 92 kg (203 lb; 14 st 7 lb)

Rugby union career
- Position: Centre / Wing
Senior career
Years	Team	Apps	(Points)
2016	Auckland	5	(0)
2017–2018	Bay of Plenty	14	(5)
2020–	New England Free Jacks	3	(10)
- Correct as of 31 January 2021

Liam Steel (born 18 May 1991) is a New Zealand rugby union player, currently playing for Major League Rugby side New England Free Jacks. His preferred position is centre or wing.

== Professional career ==
Steel signed for Major League Rugby side New England Free Jacks ahead of the 2020 Major League Rugby season, and re-signed for the 2021 Major League Rugby season. He had previously represented both Auckland and Bay of Plenty in the Mitre 10 Cup.
