= Adrienne Warren =

American actress, singer and dancer (born 1987)

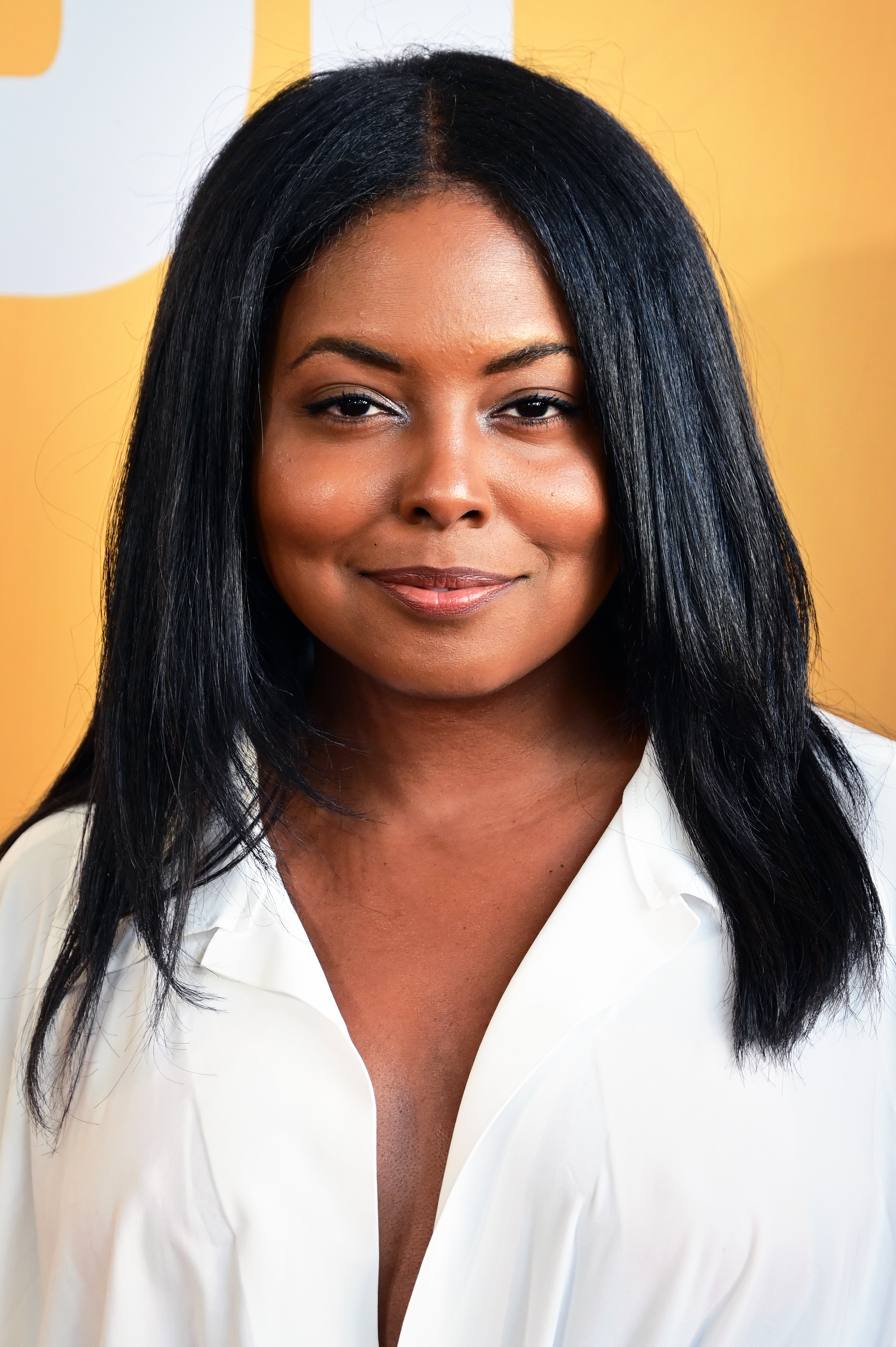
- Warren in 2026
- Education: Marymount Manhattan College
- Occupations: Actress, singer
- Years active: 2009–present

Adrienne Warren (born 6 May 1987) is an American actress, singer and dancer. She made her Broadway debut in the 2012 musical Bring It On, and in 2016 received a Tony Award for Best Featured Actress in a Musical nomination for her performance in Shuffle Along, or, the Making of the Musical Sensation of 1921 and All That Followed. She was also praised for her role as Tina Turner in the West End production of Tina in 2018, and for the same role in the Broadway production, for which she received the Tony Award for Best Actress in a Musical in 2020.

== Early life and education ==
Adrienne Warren is the daughter of two high school coaches. She began her performance career in church.

Warren studied at Marymount Manhattan College, and while there joined a rock band and performed with the Trans-Siberian Orchestra.

== Career ==
Warren began her career performing in musicals The Wiz and Dreamgirls before making her Broadway debut in the musical Bring It On in 2012. In 2016, she starred in Shuffle Along, or, the Making of the Musical Sensation of 1921 and All That Followed, for which she received Tony Award for Best Featured Actress in a Musical nomination. Warren also appeared in a number of television series, including Blue Bloods, Orange Is the New Black, and Black Box.

In 2018, Warren was cast as Tina Turner in the West End production of Tina. She received critical praise for her performance as Turner and a Laurence Olivier Award for Best Actress in a Musical nomination. The following year, she performed in the Broadway production, winning the 2020 Tony Award for Best Actress in a Musical in 2021.

In October 2020, it was announced that Warren was cast in her first television leading role in the ABC limited series Women of the Movement playing activist Mamie Till-Mobley, the mother of Emmett Till.

In December 2020, Warren narrated the audiobook of Tina Turner's memoir Happiness Becomes You, which was released by the Simon & Schuster imprint Atria Books.

In September 2021, Warren was cast in the epic film The Woman King starring Viola Davis. Inspired by true events from the 18th and 19th centuries Kingdom of Dahomey in Africa, Warren plays a warrior.

She is set to star in the new musical Imitation of Life, based on the novel by Fannie Hurst, that will premiere Off-Broadway at The Shed beginning November 21, 2026.

== Work ==
=== Theatre ===
Year	Title	Role	Venue	Ref.
2009	The Wiz	Ensemble u/s Dorothy	City Center, Encores! production	
2009–10	Dreamgirls	Lorell Robinson	Touring Production	
2011–12	Bring It On	Danielle	National Tour; St. James Theatre, Broadway Debut	
2016	Shuffle Along	Gertrude Saunders; Florence Mills	Music Box Theatre, Broadway	
2017	Damn Yankees	Gloria Thorpe	Stephen Sondheim Theatre, Broadway	
2018-19	Tina	Tina Turner	Aldwych Theatre, West End	
2019–21	Tina	Tina Turner	Lunt-Fontanne Theatre, Broadway	
2025	The Last Five Years	Cathy Hiatt	Hudson Theatre, Broadway	
2026	The Wild Party	Kate	City Center, Encores! production	
2026	Proof	Claire	Booth Theatre, Broadway	
2026	Shuffle Along	Gertrude Saunders; Florence Mills	Lincoln Center	

=== Film ===
Key
†	Denotes works that have not yet been released

Year	Title	Role	Notes
2022	The Woman King	Ode	
2023	Rustin	Claudia Taylor	

=== Television ===
Year	Title	Role	Notes
2013	Blue Bloods	Rachel Manning	Episode: "Ends and Means"
2013	Orange Is the New Black	Dina	Episode: "Bora Bora Bora"
2013	People in New Jersey	Nina	Television pilot
2014	Black Box	Carrie Waylan	Episode: "Sweet Lies Lies"
2014	Irreversible	Waitress	Television pilot
2015	Point of Honor	Abby	Television pilot
2015	Last Week Tonight with John Oliver	Maternity	Episode: "Paid Family Leave"
2016	Royal Pains	Wedding Guest	Episode: "The Good News Is..."
2017	Quantico	Malory Haynes	Episode: "MOCKINGBIRD"
2017	Perfect Citizen	Ingrid Tate	Television pilot
2017	The Tap	Nia Murphey	Television pilot
2022	Women of the Movement	Mamie Till-Mobley	Lead role
2023	Black Cake	Benny Bennett	Lead role
2024	The Diplomat	CIA officer	Episode: "The Ides of March"
2024	Doctor Odyssey	Dominique	Episode: "Quackers"

== Awards and nominations ==
Year	Award	Category	Work	Result	Ref.
2016	Tony Award	Best Featured Actress in a Musical	Shuffle Along, or, the Making of the Musical Sensation of 1921 and All That Followed	Nominated	
2018	Evening Standard Theatre Award	Best Musical Performance	Tina: The Tina Turner Musical	Nominated	
2018	Stage Debut Award	Best West End Debut	Tina: The Tina Turner Musical	Nominated	
2018	BroadwayWorld UK Award	Best Actress in a New Production of a Musical	Tina: The Tina Turner Musical	Nominated	
2019	Laurence Olivier Award	Best Actress in a Musical	Tina: The Tina Turner Musical	Nominated	
2019	WhatsOnStage Award	Best Actress in a Musical	Tina: The Tina Turner Musical	Nominated	
2020	Tony Award	Best Actress in a Musical	Tina: The Tina Turner Musical	Won	
2020	Drama Desk Award	Outstanding Actress in a Musical	Tina: The Tina Turner Musical	Won	
2020	Drama League Award	Distinguished Performance	Tina: The Tina Turner Musical	Nominated	
2020	Outer Critics Circle Award	Outstanding Actress in a Musical	Tina: The Tina Turner Musical	Honoree	
2026	Drama League Award	Distinguished Performance	The Wild Party	Pending	

== See also ==
- African-American Tony nominees and winners
