= Kobna Holdbrook-Smith =

Ghanaian-British actor

Kobna Holdbrook-Smith MBE
- Born: Kobna Kuttah Holdbrook-Smith; Accra, Ghana
- Education: Guildford School of Acting
- Occupation: Actor
- Years active: 2002–present
- Awards: Laurence Olivier Award, 2019

Kobna Kuttah Holdbrook-Smith is a Ghanaian born British actor. He has played roles in films, including Father Richard Emery in Ghost Stories (2017), Oliver in The Commuter, Templeton Frye in Mary Poppins Returns and Doctor Wren in Gwen (all 2018). He has portrayed Crispus Allen in the superhero film Justice League (2017), part of the DC Extended Universe.

For his performance in Tina in the West End, he won the Laurence Olivier Award for Best Actor in a Musical.

== Early life and education ==
Kobna Kuttah Holdbrook-Smith was born in Accra, Ghana. He grew up in Frimley, Surrey, England, where he lived with his parents, [Yoku] Henry Andrew Holdbrook-Smith and Tenu Holdbrook-Smith, and his brother, Kofi. He was initially afraid of taking up acting due to his family's disapproval, but by the age of 18, had decided that he wanted to become an actor. He attended Guildford School of Acting to study acting, graduating in 2000.

== Career ==
Holdbrook-Smith began his acting career on television in 2002 when he played Orlando Figes in the Judge John Deed episode "Everyone's Child". Since then, he has had roles in TV series such as Little Britain, Star Stories (from 2006 until 2008), Taking the Flak, Sirens, Holby City, Silk, Father Brown, The Last Panthers, Class, Dark Heart, The Split and Red Election.

His first major theatre lead came in 2005, when he played Ken in Mustapha Matura's Playboy of the West Indies at the Tricycle Theatre. He later starred in their critically acclaimed African-American Season, performing in the European premieres of Walk Hard by Abram Hill, Fabulation by Lynn Nottage and Gem of the Ocean by August Wilson. In interviews he has cited August Wilson's plays as personal favourites. In 2006 he played Levee In Ma Rainey's Black Bottom by August Wilson at the Manchester Royal Exchange Theatre, then four years later he appeared as Herald Loomis in Joe Turner's Come and Gone by August Wilson at the Young Vic Theatre.

He first appeared at the Globe in 2007 in Love's Labours Lost, which he also performed later the same year at the National Theatre of Korea, in Seoul. Holdbrook-Smith had his debut at the National Theatre in 2009 and has since starred in four productions there (most notably appearing as Mortimer in Edward II). In 2015 he played Laertes alongside Benedict Cumberbatch in Hamlet at the Barbican Theatre. This play was also broadcast live in cinemas worldwide as part of National Theatre Live.

In 2016 Holdbrook-Smith performed with Benedict Cumberbatch again, this time in Marvel’s Dr Strange. A year later he played the part of Det. Crispus Allen in DC Comics Justice League and also starred as Warden Walker in Paddington 2, and as Father Emery in Ghost Stories. In 2018, he played the role of Oliver in The Commuter and played a dual role of the live-action character Templeton Frye and the animated voice of the Weasel in Disney’s Mary Poppins Returns.

Holdbrook-Smith has also performed in BBC Radio dramas, including Judas and On Her Majesty's Secret Service. He has narrated a number of audiobooks, most notably the Rivers of London series by Ben Aaronovitch.

In 2018, Holdbrook-Smith starred in the musical Tina as Ike Turner at the Aldwych Theatre.

He was appointed Member of the Order of the British Empire (MBE) in the 2020 Birthday Honours for services to drama, and was recognised as one of the United Kingdom's most influential people of African or African Caribbean heritage when Holdbrook-Smith was included in the 2021 edition of the annual Powerlist.

In 2023, Holdbrook-Smith was awarded an honorary doctorate degree by the University of Surrey.

== Filmography ==
=== Film ===
Year	Film	Role	Notes
2013	The Double	Guard / Doctor	
2015	Hamlet	Laertes	Live in theatres
2016	Doctor Strange	Physical Therapist	
2017	Ghost Stories	Father Emery	
2017	Justice League	Detective Crispus Allen	
2017	Paddington 2	Warden Walker	
2018	The Commuter	Oliver	
2018	Mary Poppins Returns	Templeton Frye / Weasel (voice)	
2018	Gwen	Doctor Wren	
2021	Zack Snyder’s Justice League	Detective Crispus Allen	
2023	Sumotherhood	Shotti	
2023	Wonka	Officer Affable	
2024	Apartment 7A	BJ	
2025	The Gorge	Black Ops Commander	
2026	The Sheep Detectives	Reverend Hillcoate	
2027	Narnia: The Magician's Nephew †	Frank	Post-production

=== Television ===
Year	Film	Role	Notes
2002	Judge John Deed	Orlando Figes	Episode: "Everyone's Child"
2003	Casualty	PC Riddock	Episode: "Never Judge a Book"
2003	Absolute Power	Journalist No. 1	Episode: "Burn and Crash"
2004	Little Britain		2 episodes
2004	Holby City	Lee Holden	Episode: "One More Chance"
2005	Family Affairs	Officer Kennedy	1 episode
2005	According to Bex	Vox Pops	Recurring
2005	Mike Bassett: Manager	Carlton Dawes	Main cast
2006	Pulling	Joe's Father	1 episode
2006–2008	Star Stories	Various	8 episodes
2007	The Bill	Bruno Hammond	Episode: "Code of Silence"
2007	The Whistleblowers	Male Nurse	Episode: "Pandemic"
2007	Katy Brand's Big Ass Show		1 episode
2009	Whatever It Takes	Nifemi	TV movie
2009	Taking the Flak	Joyful Sifuri	Main cast
2009	PhoneShop	Graham	Episode: "New Man: Pilot"
2009	Sorry I've Got No Head	Various	Season 2 only
2010	Whites	Barnaby	1 episode
2011	Roadkill	Tommy	TV movie
2011	Sirens	Ryan Bailey	Recurring
2011	Holby City	Paul James	2 episodes
2012	Silk	Paul McGovern	1 episode
2013	Frankie	Max Hall	1 episode
2013	The Café	Jason	Recurring
2014	Turks & Caicos	Colin Maitlis	TV movie
2014	Crackanory	Commander	Episode: "In Space No One Can Hear You Clean & the Weather Man"
2014	Agatha Raisin	Rev. Jez Bloxby	Episode: "The Quiche of Death"
2015	Father Brown	Marvin Morris	Episode: "The Invisible Man"
2015	Midsomer Murders	Rob Mead	Episode: "The Dagger Club"
2015	The Last Panthers	James Davis	Miniseries; main cast
2015	Capital	Mashinko	Miniseries
2016	Class	Jasper Adeola	Episode: "Nightvisiting"
2018	Dark Heart	DS Dave Pulford	1 episode
2018–2024	The Split	Glen Peters	Recurring
2019	Motherland	Nick	Episode: "Mother's Load"
2021	Red Election	Levi Nichols	Main cast
2021	Ragdoll	Joel Shepton	3 episodes
2021	Superworm	Wizard Lizard (voice)	TV movie
2022	His Dark Materials	Balthamos	Recurring
2023	Accused	David Mingo	Episode: "Kendall's Story"
2024	The Veil	Johnson	Episode: "Crossing the Bridge"
2024	Mr Loverman	Tony	Episode #1.5
2025	Wolf King	Master Hogan / Werelord at Bast (voice)	2 episodes
2025	Dreaming Whilst Black	Rudolph	3 episodes

=== Stage ===
Year	Title	Roles	Notes
2010	Joe Turner's Come and Gone	Bynum Walker	Young Vic Theatre
2015	Hamlet	Laertes (Hamlet)	Barbican Centre
2018	Tina: The Tina Turner Musical	Ike Turner	Aldwych Theatre
2023; 2024	The Effect	Toby	Lyttelton Theatre; The Shed

=== Audio ===
List of voice performances in audio plays
Year	Title	Role	Notes
2009	Bigipedia		BBC Radio 4
2012	Lover's Rock	Ben	BBC Radio 3
2014	What Would Elizabeth Bennet Do?	James	BBC Radio 4
2014	On Her Majesty's Secret Service	Sable Basilisk	BBC Radio 4
2015	The Left Hand of Darkness	Genly Ai	BBC Radio 4
2018	Judas	John	BBC Radio 4
2020	Sherlock Holmes: The Voice of Treason	Dr. Watson	Audible Original
2021	Maynard	Marcus	BBC Radio 4
2023	7 Ghosts	David	BBC Radio 4

=== Video game ===
Year	Title	Role	Notes
2026	Directive 8020	LaMarcus Williams	Voice

== Awards and nominations ==
=== Stage ===
Year	Award	Category	Work	Result
2019	Laurence Olivier Award	Best Actor in a Musical	Tina: The Tina Turner Musical	Won
2019	Black British Theatre Award	Best Male Actor in a Musical	Tina: The Tina Turner Musical	Nominated
2019	WhatsOnStage Award	Best Actor in a Musical	Tina: The Tina Turner Musical	Nominated
