= Bayerische Theatertage =

The Bayerische Theatertage (BTT) is a theatre festival in Germany. It was founded in 1983 by August Everding and Ernst Seiltgen and is today the largest theater festival in Bavaria. The event series takes place annually at changing venues in Bavaria, the first venue (1983) was in Nuremberg. The festival is financially supported by the LfA Förderbank Bayern.
