= The Lieutenant of Inishmore =

Comedic stage play by Martin McDonagh

- Methuen cover
- Original language: English
- Written by: Martin McDonagh
- Genre: Comedy
- Setting: 1993 on the island of Inishmore, County Galway

Premiere
- Date: 2001
- Place: Other Place Theatre; Stratford-upon-Avon

The Lieutenant of Inishmore /lɛfˈtɛnənt ... ˈɪnɪʃˌmoʊr/ is a black comedy by Martin McDonagh, in which the 'mad' leader of an Irish National Liberation Army splinter group discovers that his cat has been killed. It has been produced twice in the West End and on Broadway, where it received a Tony Award nomination for Best Play. In 2014, The Lieutenant of Inishmore was ranked in The Daily Telegraph as one of the 15 greatest plays ever written.

== Plot ==
In Ireland in 1993, the Northern Ireland peace process is taking its faltering first steps. On the island of Inishmore, a middle aged man named Donny berates foolish teenager Davey for allegedly killing his cat, Wee Thomas, with his bike - although Davey claims innocence. Donny explains that he was only caring for the cat on behalf of his son Padraic. Padraic is an insane (so much so that he was considered too mad for the Irish Republican Army) Irish National Liberation Army (INLA) member known commonly as 'Mad Padraic' and loves Wee Tommy more than life itself so will cause carnage when he hears of his death. Despite his dismay, Donny forgives Davey after forcing a confession from him and miserably phones Padraic. Padraic receives the call while torturing a Belfast drug dealer named James, ready to cut his nipples off having already pulled off his toenails. When he hears that his beloved cat, Wee Thomas, is poorly, Padraic breaks down on the phone in front of James. James gives some advice on ringworm medication for the cat and promises not to sell drugs to kids any more. Padraic briefly suspects James of hoodwinking him to escape but ultimately unties him and gives him money for the bus to the hospital to inspect his potentially infected toes. Padraic then heads back home to the island of Inishmore, where he learns that Wee Thomas is not sick but has been killed and so is intent on revenge. It is then revealed that the cat was not killed by Davey but by two INLA members who did it to attract Padraic over to Inishmore so they could kill him as his madness makes him a liability. Padraic kills four people including them and two other cats before Wee Thomas is found alive and well; the first cat was mistaken for him. At this point only Donny and Davey are still alive and although annoyed at Wee Thomas for creating all this trouble, feed him cereal.

== Characters ==
- Padraic: (Age: 20 – 25. Lead)
- Davey: (Age: 17. Lead)
- Donny: (Age: 45 – 50. Lead)
- Mairead: (Age: 16. Lead)
- Christy: (Age: 30 – 50. Supporting)
- Brendan: (Age: 18 – 25. Supporting)
- Joey/James: (Age: 18 – 25. Supporting)

Certain productions might choose to double Joey and James, or have them played by two different performers. There is no official suggestion from McDonagh in the script.

== Themes ==
The character of Padraic has some connection with Cú Chulainn, a mythological Irish hero who is known to get caught in frenzy in the heat of battle, unable to tell friend from foe. Some connections that the two characters share are their notorious reputations, their ravenous fighting styles, and their lethality.

Mairead also has a thematic resemblance to the seductive goddess The Morrígan, as both male counterparts in each's respective story deny the other to accompany them in battle.

== Pre-production history ==
While the play was originally written in 1994, The Lieutenant of Inishmore would not be produced until 2001, with both the Royal National Theatre and the Royal Court Theatre refusing to produce the play. Martin McDonagh claimed that both thought the play would be too dangerous to produce, due to all of the violence. While the official statements from the two institutions claim that the rejections were due to quality control. McDonagh's claims that he and his work were being censored caused controversy years before the play was ever produced.

== Production history ==
Original RSC/West End production

The Lieutenant of Inishmore was first produced by the Royal Shakespeare Company in Stratford-upon-Avon in 2001. The production was directed by Wilson Milam. In 2002, the production transferred to the Barbican, and then to the Garrick Theatre, before touring the UK and eventually Ireland.

Original off-Broadway/Broadway production

A new production opened off-Broadway at the Atlantic Theater Company on 27 February 2006. The production received Lucille Lortel Awards, including Outstanding Play and Outstanding Lead Actor (David Wilmot, tie) with an Obie Award for Martin McDonagh. The play transferred to the Lyceum Theatre, on Broadway where it ran from 3 May to 3 September 2006. The opening night cast included Jeff Binder, Andrew Connolly, Dashiell Eaves, Peter Gerety, Domhnall Gleeson, Brian d'Arcy James, Alison Pill, and David Wilmot. It was directed by Wilson Milam, who directed the original RSC/West End production.

Subsequent North American productions

The Lieutenant of Inishmore has also been produced:

- Pittsburgh Irish and Classical Theatre, in Pittsburgh, Pennsylvania, from 12 July to 4 August 2007.
  - Steve Tolin, the special effects artist for this production received his own curtain call as his work was recognized as integral to the production.
- GableStage, in Coral Gables, Florida, from 11 August to 9 September 2007
- Fusion Theatre Company in Albuquerque, New Mexico, from 25 October to 18 November 2007
- the Alley Theatre, in the Houston Theater District, from 25 January to 24 February 2008
- Curious Theatre Company in Denver, Colorado from 8 March to 19 April 2008
- San Jose State University's Hal Todd Theatre, from 25 April to 3 May 2008
- The Repertory Theatre of St. Louis from 17 September to 13 October 2008, where it was nominated for five Kevin Kline Awards, of which it took home one.
- The New Repertory Theatre in Boston, Massachusetts, from 26 October to 6 November 2008
- Jobsite Theater in Tampa, Florida in April 2009
- Berkeley Repertory Theatre in Berkeley, California from 17 April to 24 May 2009 under the direction of Les Waters
- Northlight Theatre in Skokie, Illinois, from 29 April 2009 to 7 June 2009, directed by B.J. Jones. This production featured special effects and props designed by Steve Tolin, for which he won the 2009 Jeff Award for Outstanding Achievement in Special Effects.
- Center Theatre Group in Los Angeles from 11 July – 8 August 2010. The cast included Chris Pine as Padraic.
- A Contemporary Theater, in Seattle, in October 2010.
- the San Jose Stage Company, San Jose, California, from 26 September to 21 October 2018.
- Johnson County Community College Theatre Department in Overland Park, Kansas, from February 21 to March 2, 2025

South America

The Lieutenant of Inishmore was first produced in Lima, Peru at Teatro La Plaza ISIL, running from 24 April to 1 July 2008.

Australia

An Australian production ran from 30 September to 18 October 2008, at the Sue Benner Theatre, Metro Arts in Brisbane, Queensland. The New Theatre at Newtown in Sydney presented the play from 24 April 2018 to 26 May 2018.

Ukraine

Adapted Ukrainian version (under the name "Kytsyunya") ran in 2019 in Kyiv, presented by "Wild Theatre".

West End revival 2018

The Lieutenant of Inishmore was revived from June – September 2018 at the Noël Coward Theatre. The production is directed by Michael Grandage and stars Aidan Turner as Padraic.

== Reception ==
Upon release, The Lieutenant of Inishmore was generally well-received among British press. The Guardian gave the play an average rating of 8 out of 10 based on reviews from multiple British newspapers.

Reviews from critics praise the play for its use of extreme violence in combination with its sense of humor. Monica Fay Anderson, who made a review on the Pittsburgh Irish and Classical Theatre showing from 2007 describes it as a "terrorism comedy." Anderson also praises the special effects used in the play.

Other reviews critique the play's heavy use of violence, claiming that it is there merely for shock value and does not meaningfully contribute to the development of theater.

In addition to the controversial content seen in the play, Martin McDonagh was also criticized on his use of many Irish stereotypes in the play, and how that was presented to an English audience. This criticism was namely on McDonagh's comments on Irish Republicanism, despite him being raised in London.

== Awards and nominations ==
- 2006 Alfréd Radok Award for Best Play
- 2006 Lucille Lortel Award for Outstanding Play (win)
- 2006 Lucille Lortel Award for Outstanding Lead Actor – David Wilmot (win)
- 2006 Obie Award for Playwriting – Martin McDonagh (win)
- 2006 Tony Award Best Actor in a Play (Wilmot) (nomination)
- 2006 Tony Award Best Direction of a Play (nomination)
- 2006 Tony Award Best Featured Actor in a Play (Gleeson) (nomination)
- 2006 Tony Award Best Featured Actress in a Play (Allison Pill) (nomination)
- 2006 Tony Award Play (nomination)
- 2009 Jeff Award for Outstanding Achievements in Special Effects – Steve Tolin
- 2009 San Francisco Bay Area Critics Circle Award for Best Supporting Actor – Adam Farabee
- 2009 San Francisco Bay Area Critics Circle Award for Fight Director – Dave Maier
- 2009 San Francisco Bay Area Critics Circle Award for Best Ensemble
- 2010 Los Angeles Drama Critics Circle Award for Lead Performance – Chris Pine

=== 2018 West End revival ===
Year	Award	Category	Nominee	Result
2018	Critics’ Circle Theatre Award	Most Promising Newcomer	Chris Walley	Won
2018	Evening Standard Theatre Award	Emerging Talent	Chris Walley	Nominated
2019	Laurence Olivier Award	Best Actor in a Supporting Role	Chris Walley	Won
