= Misty (play) =

2018 play by Arinzé Kene

Misty is a 2018 play by Arinzé Kene. Directed by Omar Elerian, the piece opened at the Bush Theatre, London with an opening night on 21 March 2018, following previews from 15 March. The production closed on 21 April 2018 With the support of Luti Media, the production transferred to the Trafalgar Studios in the West End, opening on 8 September 2018. It was initially scheduled to play until 20 October, but extended its run to 17 November 2018.

== Awards and nominations ==
=== Original London production ===
Year	Award	Category	Nominee	Result
2018	Evening Standard Theatre Award	Best Musical Performance	Arinzé Kene	Nominated
2019	Laurence Olivier Award	Best New Play		Nominated
2019	Laurence Olivier Award	Best Actor	Arinzé Kene	Nominated
2019	2019 Offie	Production		Nominated
2019	2019 Offie	New Play	Arinzé Kene	Nominated
2019	2019 Offie	Performance Piece	Arinzé Kene	Won
2019	2019 Offie	Director	Omar Elerian	Nominated
2019	2019 Offie	Video Design	Daniel Denton	Nominated
