= The Little Stranger =

Book by Sarah Waters

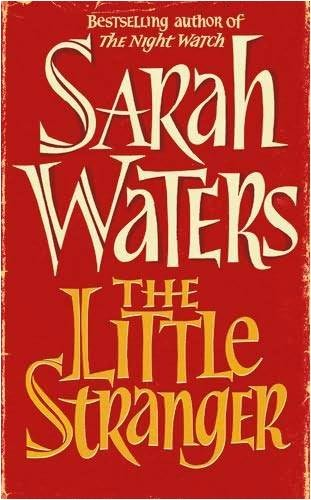
- First edition cover
- Author: Sarah Waters
- Genre: Gothic novel
- Publisher: Virago Press
- Publication date: June 4, 2009
- ISBN: 978-1-844-08601-6

The Little Stranger is also the title of one of the Color Classics series produced 13 March 1936, in three-strip Technicolor, by Fleischer Studios. It is also the 2018 film adaptation of Waters' novel.

The Little Stranger is a 2009 gothic novel written by Sarah Waters. It is a ghost story set in a dilapidated mansion in Warwickshire, England in the 1940s. Departing from her earlier themes of lesbian and gay fiction, Waters' fifth novel features a male narrator, a country doctor who makes friends with an old gentry family of declining fortunes who own a very old estate that is crumbling around them. The stress of reconciling the state of their finances with the familial responsibility of keeping the estate coincides with perplexing events which may or may not be of supernatural origin, culminating in tragedy.

Reviewers note that the themes in The Little Stranger are alternately reflections of evil and struggle related to upper class hierarchy misconfiguration in post war Britain. Waters stated that she did not set out to write a ghost story, but began her writing with an exploration of the rise of socialism in the United Kingdom and how the fading gentry dealt with losing their legacies. A mix of influences is evident to reviewers: Henry James, Shirley Jackson, Wilkie Collins, and Edgar Allan Poe. The novel was mostly well received by critics as Waters' strengths are exhibited in setting of mood and pacing of the story. It is Waters' third novel to be short-listed for the Man Booker Prize.

== Plot summary ==
In the autumn of 1948, Dr. Faraday, a struggling general practitioner in rural Warwickshire, is called to Hundreds Hall, the manor home of the Ayres family. Reminiscing about his childhood fascination with the splendid 18th Century manor, where his mother had worked as a maid before his birth, he is shocked to discover the house is now in disrepair and the Ayres family have sold off much of the house's furnishings to keep the estate afloat. He treats Betty, the Ayres' 14-year-old maid, who claims to sense something lurking in the dark, empty home. Faraday dismisses her fears as homesickness. Faraday is invited to tea by Caroline Ayres, the plain, practical daughter of the family, and meets her sardonic brother Roderick and their widowed, genteel mother. Seeing that Roderick, who has a bad leg and a number of scars gained in a wartime plane crash, is visibly struggling with the dire financials of the estate, Faraday suggests treating his bad leg with electrotherapy, doing so for free under the pretense of writing a research paper. He becomes a regular visitor to the estate, and strikes up a friendship with Caroline.

Mrs Ayres throws a cocktail party to welcome a family that has just purchased another large manor in the area, the Baker-Hydes. Faraday is invited, but becomes uncomfortable with the Baker-Hydes' condescending manner, irritated at the presence of their eight-year-old daughter Gillian, and disturbed when he realizes that the party is a pretense to introduce Caroline to Mrs Baker-Hyde's unmarried brother. The party is further disturbed by Roderick's refusal to come downstairs, claiming illness. Disaster suddenly strikes when Gillian is mauled by Caroline's ancient and previously gentle Labrador Retriever, Gyp, receiving a disfiguring bite to the face. Faraday is able to save the girl's life but the resulting threats of legal action result in Gyp being put to sleep under Caroline's strenuous objections and the hysterical claim by the maid Betty that something unseen made the dog attack.

Roderick begins to behave moodily and drink heavily, and a concerned Caroline shows Faraday that she has discovered spots on his walls and ceiling that looking like burns in the wood. Roderick grows increasingly erratic, and confesses to a disbelieving Faraday that something appeared in his room the night of the party. He says that it was first in his room trying to harm him by moving mundane objects, and when he begged it to leave, it used the dog to attack the girl. Roderick has resolved that he must keep the unseen force focused on him so as not to direct its attention to his sister or mother, and begs Faraday to keep his terror from his family. Faraday dismisses any supernatural explanation, and tells Caroline of his concerns that Roderick is having a nervous breakdown. A furious, drunken Roderick bars him from the estate. That night, Caroline wakes to discover a fire in Roderick's room, where he has passed out drunk. Evidence suggests the fire was set deliberately in several places around the room, and Roderick is committed to a mental hospital.

Caroline takes over the management of the estate, selling off a significant part of the grounds, to Faraday's displeasure, for the building of council estates. Faraday becomes aware that gossip has begun to spread about his relationship with Caroline, and he realizes he has fallen in love with her. Caroline seems to waver between returning his feelings and a confused platonic friendship. She asks him to hide their burgeoning relationship from her mother, who is beginning to show signs of forgetfulness. Soon after, odd sounds in the house begin to alarm Caroline, Mrs Ayres, Betty and the cleaning lady, Mrs Bazeley. They experience telephones ringing in the night, bells ringing at odd times and rhythmic tapping, drumming or indiscernible flutterings heard in the walls. They find curious childish writing on the walls where these activities have taken places, which badly affects Mrs Ayres. A 19th century tube communication device linking the kitchen to the abandoned second-floor nursery begins to sound, scaring the maids. When Mrs Ayres goes to investigate, she is mysteriously locked in the nursery where Susan, her much-loved first daughter, died of diphtheria at eight years old. She experiences shadows, tapping and running footsteps behind the locked door, culminating in hearing a whispering childlike voice through the speaking tube. Frantic to escape, Mrs Ayres pounds the windows open, cutting her arms badly. After Caroline and the maids free her, Faraday is called to the house to dress her wounds. Caroline tells Faraday she believes the house is being affected by a poltergeist, which she believes is a telekinetic force caused unintentionally by a living person. She suspects Roderick's stress at trying to salvage the estate has left behind a psychic impression on the house, which has now affected both him and their mother.

Several weeks later, Mrs Ayres appears to have recovered, but Faraday is shocked to discover that she has come to believe that the ghostly presence in the house is Susan, and takes comfort that Susan is around her at all times. Faraday is shocked to see a bloody scratch appear on her chest, and Mrs Ayres explains that Susan is impatient to be with her and sometimes harms her in her eagerness. Faraday believes the wounds are self-inflicted, and convinces a reluctant Caroline to put her mother in a care home for her own safety so that they may live peacefully at Hundreds after they marry. Caroline is shocked he plans to live at the manor, but agrees that her mother should be taken to safety. The next morning, Caroline wakes to discover her mother has hanged herself in her bedroom, and that her body bears the marks of a number of seemingly-self-inflicted wounds, scratches and bites.

The day of Mrs Ayres' funeral, Faraday pressures Caroline to agree to marry him, and she agrees to a date in six weeks' time. He happily begins preparing for the wedding and begins to fantasize about living at Hundreds while a grieving Caroline is listless and uninterested in wedding planning or managing the estate. The day Faraday brings her the wedding dress and ring he has selected for her, she breaks off their engagement, telling him she does not love him and announces she plans to sell Hundreds Hall and move abroad. Faraday refuses to accept her decision and throws the ring at her, cracking a window pane. He tries several times to talk Caroline out of her decision with increasing vehemence and desperation.

On the night of their would-be wedding, Faraday has a call that takes him out until the middle of the night, and he falls asleep in his car near the grounds of Hundreds Hall. When he finally comes home the next morning, he learns that Caroline is dead, having fallen from the second floor onto a marble landing. At the inquest, Betty reports that she awoke to hear Caroline go upstairs to investigate a sound she heard in the darkened hall. She simply cried out "You!" then fell to her death. Betty publicly shares her belief that the house was haunted, to the court's general derision. Faraday is asked to testify at the inquest, and has a momentary vision on the stand of Caroline fleeing from something in terror. He pulls himself together and testifies that Caroline had also believed the house to be haunted, and that he believes her death was a suicide.

Three years later, Faraday's practice is thriving under the new National Health Service and Hundreds Hall remains unsold. Faraday retains the only keys to the now-derelict mansion, and caretakes for the home as much as he can. The novel closes as he reflects that as much as he tries to discover what Caroline saw the night she died, he can only ever see his own reflection in a cracked window pane.

== Style ==
Sara O'Leary in The Gazette states that Waters' narrative voice is her strongest asset and that she has an "uncanny ability to synthesize her research and is never expository in the telling details she draws upon—tiny little things about what people wore or ate or had in their houses". Emma Donoghue in The Globe and Mail remarks on the diversion from the narrative style in The Little Stranger. Waters is known in her previous four novels for providing plot twists, but this one, notes Donoghue, provides a straightforward accounting that tackles issues of insanity, poltergeists, and family secrets "with a minimum of tricks". The review in The Washington Post concurs, using a quote by Henry James to say everything to be done in the way of ghost stories and haunted houses has been done. Ron Charles states that the novel is not clichéd due to Waters' restraint: "the story's sustained ambiguity is what keeps our attention, and her perfectly calibrated tone casts an unnerving spell". A similar review appeared in The Australian calling attention to Waters' "moderation and flawless cadence" that forms "a story pulsing with malevolent energy" and an "atmosphere is wickedly, addictively tense".

In The Sunday Telegraph, John Preston writes that "the richness of Waters's writing ensures that the air of thickening dread is very thick indeed. Everything, from Mrs Ayres's 'absurdly over-engineered shoes', to the hairs on Caroline's legs—each one 'laden with dust, like an eye-blacked lash'—is described with a wonderfully sharp eye." Waters herself acknowledges the light-handedness of the supernatural elements of the story, stating "I wanted the ghost story to be fairly subtle. The ghost stories that I've enjoyed are uncanny, unsettling and eerie more than they are about in-your-face pyrotechnics. I wanted it to be very based in the social context of the time, but for it to have this extra element of strangeness."

Several references in The Little Stranger indicate the influences Waters used in its composition. Rebecca Starford in The Australian praises Waters' ability to use elements from other authors: "Waters is one of the great contemporary storytellers. She has never made bones about borrowing", noting that her inspirations for this story were Daphne du Maurier, Henry James, Agatha Christie, and Charles Dickens. As children, Roderick and Caroline changed the hands of a broken clock to twenty minutes to nine, thinking it amusing to reflect the stopped clocks of Miss Havisham's house from Dickens' Great Expectations. Like the narrator of du Maurier's Rebecca, Faraday has no first name; the man overcome by the house in Poe's The Fall of the House of Usher is also named Roderick. Peter Cannon in Publishers Weekly writes that the novel is evocative of Henry James' The Turn of the Screw and Shirley Jackson's The Haunting of Hill House.

== Themes ==
=== Evil ===
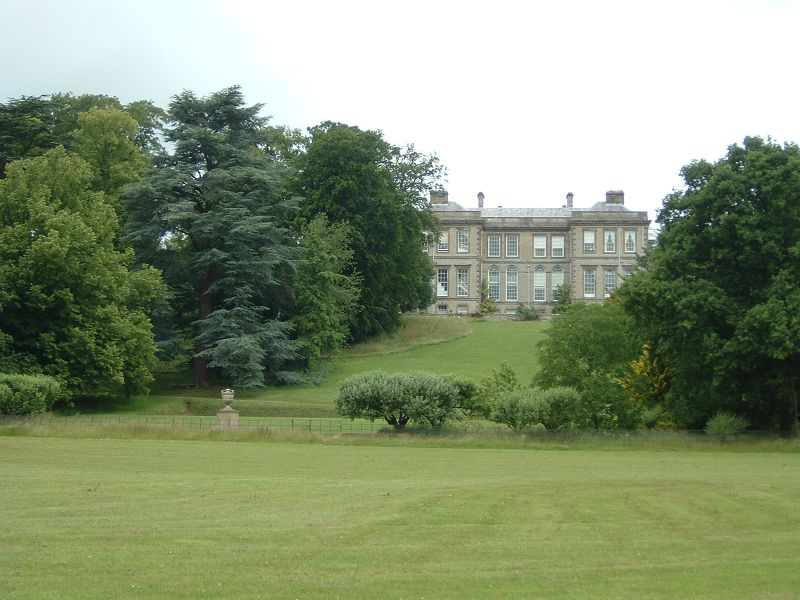
The Little Stranger is set in an estate similar to Ragley Hall in Warwickshire with extensive grounds, although many rooms in Hundreds Hall are closed, making it seem partially paralysed.

As a doctor, Faraday is a rational narrator who confronts each member of the Ayres family and the maids in turn as they divulge their suspicions that something in the house is alive. As he consults with other physicians, they are able to explain away the strange happenings easily with answers supplied by medicine and psychology. Waters does not give definitive answers about the occurrences, leaving it more a philosophical issue. Not wanting to frustrate the reader however, she admits "I tried to keep it strange, keep what was happening genuinely odd, without closing it down with a neat explanation at the end." The title of the book is a reference to Faraday's continuing questions; Roderick is fearful that the house is infectious. Eventually Faraday wonders if it is "consumed by some dark germ, some ravenous shadow-creature, some 'little stranger' spawned from the troubled unconscious of someone connected with the house itself".

Emma Donoghue considers the deepest theme of the story to be "the unpindownability of evil", as suspicion shifts to individuals who may be self-destructing from the forces around them, possible malevolent motivations from the family or house staff, an unseen force inhabiting the house, or Faraday himself. Faraday's concern for the family is often intertwined for concern for the house so that he often discourages those who are obviously troubled by staying there from leaving it. He explains away the suspicions of Mrs Ayres, who believes that Susan is in the house trying to hasten their reunion; Caroline, who believes that Roderick is so upset in the mental institution that a part of him is trying to contact the family to warn them of something; and Betty, the maid who is convinced the malevolent spirit of a former domestic resides on the second floor of the home. Faraday's rationalisations become increasingly improbable as he blames all the strangeness on fatigue, stress, even the house's plumbing., The novel implies in its closing moments that Faraday himself is the malevolent presence at Hundreds, subconsciously motivated by his desire for the house itself, and the 2018 film adaptation depicts this interpretation directly. Ron Charles in The Washington Post considers Faraday's deep concern for the family that is often mixed with envy to be influenced by Patricia Highsmith's psychopathic manipulator Tom Ripley.

=== Class ===
Class and ambition are repeatedly referenced in the novel. Faraday's mother was at one time a nursery maid at Hundreds Hall, much like Waters' grandparents who were domestics in a country estate; the reader is first given a description of its opulence when the narrator is a child and he attends a garden fête, and is so entranced with the building he plies a piece of it off and puts it in his pocket. He often revisits his memory of his first significant impression of the mansion comparing it with its current state. Soldiers were billeted in its rooms during the recent war. Two centuries of wear and weather have taken their toll, and the taxes on the British gentry are too high for the family to bear. They attempt to reconcile their family legacy with the reality of having no money to keep it up. Charlotte Heathcote in The Sunday Express and Rebecca Starford in The Australian both note that the novel is preoccupied with class.

Faraday too is conflicted as he recounts how his family sacrificed everything including his mother's health and life to give him his education. He laments that he has not achieved anything with it and he visits Hundreds Hall vacillating between being flattered and feeling unworthy of knowing a family like the Ayreses. They, however, seem resolute about being unable to afford the upkeep of the house and once Roderick is gone, Caroline and Mrs Ayres are ambivalent about staying in the house. It is Faraday who is most indignant about the family being forced to sell their land and possessions. Faraday is an unreliable narrator, and reviewers noted the slight discrepancies in what he says to the family as their doctor and his devotion to the house at their expense.

Near the end, as Faraday attempts to explain reasonably and scientifically why the family for which he has grown so fond is falling apart, he wonders what must be eating them alive; a friend blurts, "Something is....It's called a Labour government." Barry Didock notes that Waters captures the stark mood of postwar Britain that Evelyn Waugh highlighted in Brideshead Revisited, where the social changes being wrought did not make the future seem optimistic at all. The anxiety about the future is so all-consuming that Scarlett Thomas in The New York Times suggests it is the cause for speculation about each character's sanity. Waters concedes that although her novels are all period pieces, they are not meant to instill an overwhelming romantic sense of nostalgia: "I'd hate to think that my writing's escapist. For me, my interest in the past is closely linked to my interest in the present, in the historical process of how things lead to others."

=== Plot Twist ===
Waters' writing was well-received upon the publication of her first novel,Tipping the Velvet, a story set in Victorian London. She began writing in her early thirties while completing a dissertation in English literature about gay and lesbian fiction from the 1870s onward. Not enjoying expository writing, she attempted fiction and finding that she liked it, followed Tipping the Velvet with Affinity, another Victorian-set novel with gothic themes, and Fingersmith, also Victorian yet more of a Dickensian crime drama. All three have significant lesbian themes and characters; Waters often labels them as "Victorian lesbo romps". To avoid being pigeonholed as a niche writer, however (asking "Why, oh why, did I ever allow the phrase 'lesbo Victorian romp' to cross my lips?"), she followed these with The Night Watch, which also has gay and lesbian characters, but is set in the 1940s.

For The Little Stranger, Waters diverted from overt lesbian themes, but incorporated other elements from previous books. A character in Affinity talks to spirits of the dead; the setting of Fingersmith is a large country estate inhabited by a small family and house staff; The Night Watch is set in post-WWII Britain with characters who are somewhat at a loss with what to do following the upheaval of war. Barry Didock in The Herald considers The Night Watch a companion piece to The Little Stranger. Waters states that the change from a conservative to socialist society was her true impetus for writing The Little Stranger: "I didn't set out to write a haunted house novel. I wanted to write about what happened to class in that post-war setting. It was a time of turmoil in exciting ways. Working class people had come out of the war with higher expectations. They had voted in the Labour government. They want change.... So it was a culture in a state of change. But obviously for some people it was a change for the worse." She had originally set out to rewrite a version of The Franchise Affair by Josephine Tey, which is a courtroom thriller about a middle-class family accused of kidnapping a young girl.

Waters is well known for the immense amount of research she conducts for her novels. Groundwork for The Night Watch also found its way into The Little Stranger; after this probing she concluded 1947 was "a miserable year". Much of her time preparing for this novel was spent in Warwickshire estate homes and local newspaper archives. She told The Globe and Mail

I read a lot of novels from the period. And diaries were a wonderful resource. I also watched films from that period and went to museums and archives to look at ephemera from the period. I like to try to capture the idiom and slang... A writer at that time wouldn't have used profanity in a respectable novel. But if you look at diaries or letters, people were swearing all the time, in very modern-sounding ways. One of the excitements about writing about the past from the present is that you can put in a lot of the details that the mainstream novelists of the time couldn't because of the conventions of the time.

== Reception ==
Ron Charles in The Washington Post calls The Little Stranger "deliciously creepy", stating that the tale is "one screw away from The Fall of the House of Usher". Erica Wagner, a reviewer for The Times confesses that "left alone one night in [her] boxy Seventies ex-council house—about as unspooky a place as you can imagine—had to stop reading for fright". Corinna Hente in The Herald Sun writes "This is a terrific, chilling read you can get lost in, from a first-class storyteller", although she accedes that the novel is slow to start and readers may be disappointed with the ambiguous ending. Charlotte Heathcote calls Waters "a darkly masterful storyteller with a rare gift for bringing a bygone era to vibrant life". The ambiguity of the jostling between evil and class was praised by Scarlett Thomas in The New York Times; she notes, "Sarah Waters is an excellent, evocative writer, and this is an incredibly gripping and readable novel", but certain questions about the likable Ayres family, who are killed as if by being socially redundant, leave Thomas uncomfortable.

Kirkus Reviews was similarly pleased with Waters's detail, but considered the relaxing of tension in crucial places and Faraday's sometimes second-hand narration of events in Hundreds Hall flawed. They write, however, that Waters "work[s] in traditions established by Edgar Allan Poe, Sheridan le Fanu and Wilkie Collins, expertly teasing us with suggestive allusions to the classics of supernatural fiction. A subtle clue planted in one character's given name neatly foreshadows, then explains, the Ayres family's self-destructive insularity." John Preston in The Sunday Telegraph was disappointed with the ending, complaining of the loss of tension, but states, "it's still a hell of a ride getting there". Tom Beer in Newsday greatly praised the novel, writing that "the pleasures of The Little Stranger aren't those of your garden-variety suspense novel. They lie, instead, with the author's uncanny ability to paint her characters and their world and to seduce the reader into following along with her. Hundreds Hall is a pretty gloomy place, but I was thrilled to spend time there, under the guidance of this supremely gifted storyteller."

Following Fingersmith and The Night Watch, The Little Stranger became Waters' third novel to be short-listed for the Man Booker Prize. Salon.com chose the novel as one of the best books of 2009. In autumn 2018, a film adaptation directed by Lenny Abrahamson and starring Domhnall Gleeson and Ruth Wilson was released.

== Citations ==
- References to The Little Stranger correspond to Waters, Sarah (2009). The Little Stranger, Riverhead Trade (American edition). ISBN 978-1-59448-880-1
