= Little Stranger =

Little Stranger may refer to:

- Little Stranger (album), a 2011 album by Annah Mac
- Little Stranger (film), a 1934 British drama film
- Little Stranger (company), a film and television production company
- Little Stranger (band), an American alternative hip hop duo
- The Little Stranger, a 2009 novel by Sarah Waters
- The Little Stranger (film), a 2018 film, based on the novel
