= Zoë Tapper =

British actress (born 1981)

- Born: 26 October 1981 (age 44); Bromley, Greater London, England
- Education: Royal Central School of Speech and Drama
- Occupation: Actress
- Years active: 2003–present
- Spouse: Oliver Dimsdale
- Children: 2

Zoë Tapper (born 26 October 1981) is an English actress who first came to prominence playing Nell Gwynne in Richard Eyre's award-winning film Stage Beauty in 2004. She is known for portraying Anya Raczynski in Survivors, and Mina Harker in Demons.

== Early life and education ==
Tapper was born in Bromley, Kent. She trained at the Academy Drama School and the Central School of Speech and Drama, from which she graduated in the spring of 2003, days before taking on her first film role.

== Career ==
On stage Tapper has appeared in Epitaph for George Dillon in the West End, and Othello at Shakespeare's Globe.

Following her film debut in Stage Beauty, Tapper played Gwendolyn in Mrs. Palfrey at the Claremont (2005), alongside Joan Plowright, and Diana Shaw in These Foolish Things (2006), alongside Anjelica Huston.

Her television credits include Mary Collins in A Harlot's Progress for Channel 4, Jane in Oliver Parker's The Private Life of Samuel Pepys, Gemma in the first series of the Sky One drama Hex, and Jenny Maple in the BBC miniseries Twenty Thousand Streets Under the Sky. She also played Hermia in ShakespeaRe-Told: A Midsummer Night's Dream, the 2005 BBC adaptation/modernisation of Shakespeare's play of the same name.

In 2008, Tapper portrayed Sheila Steafel in the BBC television play The Curse of Steptoe, and Anya Raczynski in the BBC remake of Survivors, alongside Max Beesley, Paterson Joseph and Julie Graham. She also played Selina Dawes in the ITV adaptation of the novel Affinity, opposite Anna Madeley as Margaret Prior. It premiered at the Miami Gay & Lesbian Film Festival, and in the UK on 28 December 2008 on ITV.

In 2009, she appeared in the ITV fantasy drama series Demons as blind vampire-turned-monster hunter Mina Harker. She played Effie Gray in the BBC Two period drama Desperate Romantics. In 2010, she played Hannah in the BBC television pilot Reunited.

In 2013, Tapper appeared as Ellen Love in Mr Selfridge.

In 2017, Tapper played the character of Katy Sutcliffe in the ITV Thriller series, Liar (TV series). She reprised the role of Katy for series 2 of Liar in 2020.

== Personal life ==
Tapper met actor Oliver Dimsdale in 2004, and they were married in 2008. In April 2011, they had their first daughter, Ava. They have since had another daughter.

== Filmography ==
=== Film ===
Year	Title	Role	Notes
2004	Stage Beauty	Nell Gwynn	
2005	Mrs. Palfrey at the Claremont	Gwendolyn	
2006	These Foolish Things	Diana Shaw	
2008	Affinity	Selina Dawes	
2010	Baseline	Jessica	
2012	The Grind	Nancy	
2012	Cheerful Weather for the Wedding	Evelyn	
2012	What You Will	Katie Reed	
2012	Blood	Jemma Vern	
2018	Death Do Us Part	Karen	
2019	Stand Still	Susannah	Short film. Also writer and executive producer
2020	The Good Traitor	Zilla Sears	
2020	Big Boys Don't Cry	Anthea	
2020	Natives	Hayley	Short film
2021	A Violent Man	Claire Keats	

=== Television ===
Year	Title	Role	Notes
2003	The Private Life of Samuel Pepys	Jane	Television film
2004	Cutting It	Nanda Levigne	Series 3; episode 3
2004	Hex	Gemma	Series 1; episodes 1–4
2005	Twenty Thousand Streets Under the Sky	Jenny Maple	Mini-series; episodes 1–3
2005	Jericho	Karen Gower	Mini-series; episode 4: "The Hollow Men"
2005	ShakespeaRe-Told	Hermia	Mini-series; episode 4: "A Midsummer Night's Dream"
2006	Foyle's War	Susan Davies	Series 4; episode 1: "Invasion"
2006	Hotel Babylon	Mrs. Radley	Series 1; episode 2
2006	A Harlot's Progress	Mary Collins	Television film
2007	Agatha Christie's Marple	Kay Strange	Series 3; episode 3: "Towards Zero"
2008	The Curse of Steptoe	Sheila Steafel	Television film
2008	Small Dark Places	Ester Hamilton	Television short film
2008–2010	Survivors	Dr. Anya Raczynski	Series 1 & 2; 12 episodes
2009	Demons	Mina Harker	Mini-series; episodes 1–6
2009	Desperate Romantics	Effie Ruskin / Effie Millais	Mini-series; episodes 1–3, 5 & 6
2010	Reunited	Hannah	Television film
2010	Coming Up	Jennifer / Chloe / Woman	Series 8; episode 6: "Eclipse"
2011	Zen	Donatella Pirotta	Mini-series; episode 3: "Ratking"
2013	Mr Selfridge	Ellen Love	Series 1; episodes 1–6 & 8–10
2014	The Musketeers	Alice Clerbeaux	Series 1; episode 8: "The Challenge"
2015	Valentine's Kiss	Sophie Whiteley	Mini-series; episodes 1 & 2
2015	Lewis	Elizabeth Capstone	Series 9; episodes 5 & 6: "What Lies Tangled: Parts 1 & 2"
2017	Safe House	Sam Stenham	Series 2; episodes 1–4
2017–2020	Liar	Katy Sutcliffe	Series 1 & 2; 12 episodes
2018	Nightflyers	Joy d'Branin	Episodes 1–4 & 10
2020	Grantchester	Betsey Granger	Series 5; episode 3
2021	The One	Kate Saunders	Episodes 1–8
2022	Rules of the Game	Vanessa Jenkins	Mini-series; episodes 1–4
2022–present	Grace	Cleo Morey	Series 2–6; 18 episodes
2025	I, Jack Wright	Georgia Wright	Episodes 1–6

=== Video games ===
Year	Title	Role	Notes
2018	Pillars of Eternity II: Deadfire	Captain Aeldys (voice)	
2018	Battlefield V	Voice Acting Talent (voice)	
2019	Final Fantasy XIV: Shadowbringers	Oracle of Light / Theva (voice)	
