= Mary Jo Randle =

English actress (born 1954)

- Born: 26 April 1954 (age 72); Rochdale, Lancashire, England
- Education: University of Birmingham
- Occupation: Actress
- Years active: 1982–present
- Known for: The Bill; The Lakes

Mary Jo Randle (born 26 April 1954) is an English actress from Rochdale, Lancashire working in theatre and television.

After a childhood in Littleborough, Randle left home to study for a degree in drama at the University of Birmingham but switched course to Social Administration. Upon graduation she applied and was accepted for a place at RADA, where she was the recipient of the Bancroft Gold Medal. In 1981 she won Most Promising Actress at the Ronson awards.

Mary Jo Randle is best known for her roles as Jo Morgan in The Bill (1993–1995) and Bernie Quinlan in The Lakes. She has also featured in Holby City, Emmerdale, Victoria Wood as Seen on TV, The Royal, Casualty, Doctors, Heartbeat, Inspector Morse, Dalziel and Pascoe, Bad Behaviour, Wire in the Blood and a public information film on smoke alarms.

== Career ==
=== Film ===
| Year | Title | Role | Notes |
|---|---|---|---|
| 1993 | Bad Behaviour | Winifred Turner | |
| 2000 | Hollow Man | Janice Walton | |
| 2003 | Gifted | Mrs Gilliam | |
| 2006 | Pierrepoint | Mrs Corbitt | |
| 2007 | Control | Deborah Curtis' mother | |
| 2008 | Affinity | Mrs. Jelf | |
| 2010 | Soul Boy | Rose McCain | |
| 2010 | Another Year | Mourner | |

=== Television ===
| Year | Title | Role | Notes |
|---|---|---|---|
| 1982 | Play for Today: Another Flip for Dominick | Pilar | |
| 1985 | Victoria Wood: As Seen on TV | Sarah Wells | Series 1; episode 3 |
| 1986 | Victoria Wood: As Seen on TV | Kelly-Marie's Friend | Series 2; episodes 2 and 4 |
| 1986 | London's Burning | Marion Cartwright II | Pilot |
| 1989 | Act of Will | Sister Rodgers | Episode 1 |
| 1990 | Inspector Morse | Detective Sergeant Siobhan Maitland | Episode: "Driven to Distraction" |
| 1991 | The Bill | Moira Smith | Episode: "Samaritan" |
| 1991 | Screen One | Jill | Episode: "Ex" |
| 1992 | Screen Two | Television producer | Episode: "My Sister-Wife" |
| 1992 | The Ruth Rendell Mysteries | Renie Thompson | Episode: "The Speaker of Mandarin" |
| 1992 | Between the Lines | Kate Norton | Episode: "The Only Good Copper" |
| 1992 | A Time to Dance | Mrs. Atkinson | Episode 1 |
| 1993 | Olly's Prison | Vera | |
| 1993–1995 | The Bill | WDS Jo Morgan | Series regular; 78 episodes |
| 1997 | Born to Run | Teresa | Recurring role; 6 episodes |
| 1997–1999 | The Lakes | Bernie Quinlan | Series regular; 14 episodes |
| 1999 | Holby City | Marie | Episode: "Brave Heart" |
| 1999 | Casualty | Marie Davies | Episode: "Mother's Day" |
| 1999 | Heartbeat | Shirley Colbourne | Episode: "No Surrender" |
| 2002 | Cutting It | Laverne Butt | Series 1: episode 2; Series 2: episode 2 |
| 2003 | Cambridge Spies | Marge | Episode 2 |
| 2003 | Between the Sheets | Christine Ellis | Recurring role; 6 episodes |
| 2004 | Midsomer Murders | Janet Pennyman | Episode: "Things That Go Bump in the Night" |
| 2005 | The Royal | Fay Wallace | Episode: "While the Cat's Away" |
| 2006 | Dalziel and Pascoe | Moira Henshaw | Episode: "Fallen Angel" |
| 2007 | The Street | Jean's mother | Episode: "The Promise" |
| 2008 | Wire in the Blood | Janet Williams | Episode: "The Dead Land" |
| 2009 | Small Island | Queenie's mother | Episode 1 |
| 2009 | Blue Murder | Carol Aspen | Episode: "Inside" |
| 2009 | Red Riding | Eddie's mother | Episode: "In the Year of Our Lord 1974" |
| 2009 | Inspector George Gently | Mrs Chadwick | Episode: "Gently in the Night" |
| 2011 | Waking the Dead | Trish Somers | Episode: "Care" |
| 2013 | The Syndicate | Dawn | Series 2; episodes 2 and 6 |
| 2015 | Wolf Hall | Mercy Pryor | Recurring role; 3 episodes |
| 2020 | The English Game | Publican | Episodes 1 and 6 |

=== Theatre ===
| Year | Title | Role | Notes |
|---|---|---|---|
| 1981 | A View from the Bridge | Catherine | Victoria Theatre, Stoke-on-Trent |
| 1982 | A Midsummer Night's Dream | Helena | New Vic Theatre, Newcastle under Lyme |
| 1982 | Macbeth | Lady Macbeth | New Vic Theatre, Newcastle under Lyme |
| 1984 | As You Like It | Company | Royal Shakespeare Company, Stratford-Upon-Avon |
| 1985 | Steaming | Josie | Haymarket Theatre, Leicester |
| 1985 | Philistines | Marya Tsvtaeva / Peasant | Royal Shakespeare Company, The Other Place, Stratford-upon-Avon |
| 1985 | Troilus and Cressida | Cassandra | Royal Shakespeare Theatre, Stratford-upon-Avon |
| 1985 | Les Liaisons Dangereuses | Emilie | Royal Shakespeare Company, The Other Place, Stratford-upon-Avon |
| 1986 | Dearly Beloved | Devised by / Performer | Royal Shakespeare Company, Almeida Theatre |
| 1987 | A Yorkshire Tragedy: Not so New as Lamentable and True | Wife | National Theatre, Dorfman Theatre |
| 1988 | The Public | Company | Theatre Royal Stratford East |
| 1995 | Renegades | Pippa | Bristol Old Vic, Theatre Royal |
| 2015 | Big Pants and Botox | Performer | Wyllyotts Theatre, Potters Bar |
