= Sarah Waters =

Welsh novelist (born 1966)

Sarah Waters OBE
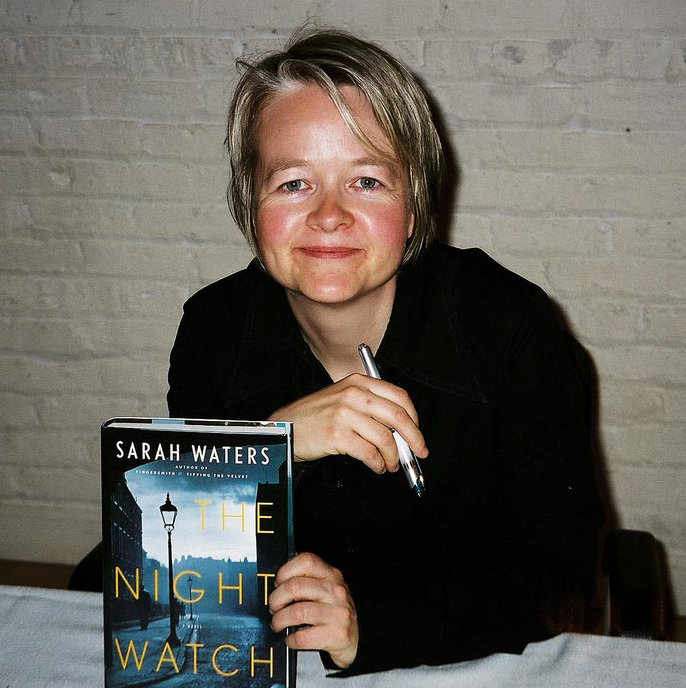
- Waters at a book signing in 2006
- Born: 21 July 1966 (age 60); Neyland, Pembrokeshire, Wales
- Education: University of Kent; Lancaster University; Queen Mary University of London
- Occupation: Novelist
- Partner: Lucy Vaughan (2002–present)
- Writing career
- Period: 1998–present
- Genre: Historical fiction
- Website: sarahwaters.com

Sarah Ann Waters OBE (born 21 July 1966) is a Welsh novelist. She is best known for her novels set in Victorian society and featuring lesbian protagonists, such as Tipping the Velvet (1998) and Fingersmith (2002). Both novels were adapted into TV mini-series by BBC in 2002 and 2005 respectively. The latter novel was also adapted into the South Korean film The Handmaiden (2016).

== Life and education ==
=== Early life ===
Sarah Waters was born in Neyland, Pembrokeshire, Wales, in 1966. She later moved to Middlesbrough, England, when she was eight years old. She grew up in a family that included her father Ron, mother Mary, and a "much older" sister. Her mother was a housewife and her father an engineer who worked on oil refineries. She describes her family as "pretty idyllic, very safe and nurturing". Her father, "a fantastically creative person", encouraged her to build and invent.

Waters said, "When I picture myself as a child, I see myself constructing something, out of plasticine or papier-mâché or Meccano; I used to enjoy writing poems and stories, too." She wrote stories and poems that she describes as "dreadful gothic pastiches", but had not planned her career. Despite her obvious enjoyment of writing, she did not feel any special calling or preference for becoming a novelist in her youth.

I don’t know if I thought about it much, really. I know that, for a long time, I wanted to be an archaeologist – like lots of kids. And I think I knew I was headed for university, even though no one else in my family had been. I really enjoyed learning. I remember my mother telling me that I might one day go to university and write a thesis, and explaining what a thesis was; and it seemed a very exciting prospect. I was clearly a bit of a nerd.

Waters was a supporter of the Campaign for Nuclear Disarmament, joining as a result of her boyfriend at the time. Politically, she has always identified as a leftist.

=== Education ===
After Milford Haven Grammar School, Waters attended university and earned degrees in English literature. She received a BA from the University of Kent, an MA from Lancaster University, and a PhD from Queen Mary, University of London. Her PhD thesis, entitled Wolfskins and togas: lesbian and gay historical fictions, 1870 to the present, served as inspiration and material for future books. As part of her research she read 19th-century pornography, in which she came across the title of her first book, Tipping the Velvet. However, her literary influences are also found in the popular classics of Victorian literature, such as Charles Dickens, Wilkie Collins, Mary Shelley and the Brontës, and in the contemporary novelists that combine a keen interest in Victoriana with a post-modernist approach to fiction, especially A.S. Byatt and John Fowles. Angela Carter's Nights at the Circus had a huge influence on her début novel as well; Waters praises Carter for her literary prose, her "common touch", and her commitment to feminism.

=== Personal life ===
Waters came out as lesbian in the late 1980s. She has been in a relationship with copy editor Lucy Vaughan since 2002. As of 2007, she lived in Kennington, south-east London.

== Career ==
Before writing novels, Waters worked as an academic, earning a doctorate and teaching. Waters went directly from her doctoral thesis to her first novel. It was during the process of writing her thesis that she thought she would write a novel; she began as soon as the thesis was complete. Her work is very research-intensive, which is an aspect she enjoys. Waters was briefly a member of the long-running London North Writers circle, whose members have included the novelists Charles Palliser and Neil Blackmore, among others.

With the exception of The Little Stranger, all of her books contain lesbian themes, and she does not mind being labelled a lesbian writer. She said, "I'm writing with a clear lesbian agenda in the novels. It's right there at the heart of the books." Despite this "common agenda in teasing out lesbian stories from parts of history that are regarded as quite heterosexual", she also calls her lesbian protagonists "incidental", due to her own sexual orientation. "That's how it is in my life, and that's how it is, really, for most lesbian and gay people, isn't it? It's sort of just there in your life."

=== Tipping the Velvet (1998) ===
Her debut work was the Victorian picaresque Tipping the Velvet, published by Virago Press in 1998. The novel took 18 months to write. The book takes its title from Victorian slang for cunnilingus. Waters describes the novel as a "very upbeat [...] kind of a romp".

It won a 1999 Betty Trask Award, and was shortlisted for the Mail on Sunday / John Llewellyn Rhys Prize.

In 2002, the novel was adapted into a three-part television serial of the same name for BBC Two. It has been translated into at least 24 languages, including Chinese, Latvian, Hungarian, Korean and Slovenian.

=== Affinity (1999) ===
Waters's second book, Affinity, was published a year after her first, in 1999. The novel, also set in the Victorian era, centres on the world of Victorian Spiritualism. While finishing her debut novel, Waters had been working on an academic paper on spiritualism. She combined her interests in spiritualism, prisons, and the Victorian era in Affinity, which tells the story of the relationship between an upper-middle-class woman and an imprisoned spiritualist.

The novel is less light-hearted than the ones that preceded and followed it. Waters found it less enjoyable to write. "It was a very gloomy world to have to go into every day", she said.

Affinity won the Stonewall Book Award and Somerset Maugham Award. Andrew Davies wrote a screenplay adapting Affinity and the resulting feature film premiered 19 June 2008 at the opening night of Frameline the San Francisco LGBT Film Festival at the Castro Theater.

=== Fingersmith (2002) ===
Fingersmith was published in 2002. It was shortlisted for the Booker Prize and the Orange Prize.

Fingersmith was made into a serial for BBC One in 2005, starring Sally Hawkins, Elaine Cassidy and Imelda Staunton. Waters approved of the adaptation, calling it "a really good quality show", and said it was "very faithful to the book. It was spookily faithful to the book at times, which was exciting." The novel was later adapted again by South Korean director Park Chan-wook into the 2016 film The Handmaiden, which set the story in Japanese-occupied Korea in the 1930s.

Fingersmith was named by singer and artist David Bowie as one of his "top 100 books".

=== The Night Watch (2006) ===
The Night Watch took four years for Waters to write. It differs from the first three novels in its time period and its structure. Although her thesis and previous books focused on the 19th century, Waters said that "Something about the 1940s called to me". It was also less tightly plotted than her other books. Waters said,

I had more or less to figure the book out as I went along – a very time-consuming and unnerving experience for me, as I tried out scenes and chapters in lots of different ways. I ended up with a pile of rejected scenes about three feet high. It was satisfying in the end, realising just what should go where; but a lot of the time it felt like a wrestling match.

The novel tells the stories of a man and three women in 1940s London. Waters describes it as "fundamentally a novel about disappointment and loss and betrayal", as well as "real contact between people and genuine intimacy".

In 2005, Waters received the highest bid (£1,000) during a charity auction in which the prize was the opportunity to have the winner's name immortalised in The Night Watch. The auction featured many notable British novelists, and the name of the bidder, author Martina Cole, appeared in Waters' novel.

The Night Watch was adapted for television by BBC2 and broadcast on 12 July 2011.

=== The Little Stranger (2009) ===
Also set in the 1940s, The Little Stranger also differs from Waters' previous novels. It is her first with no overtly lesbian characters. Initially, Waters set out to write a book about the economic changes brought by socialism in postwar Britain, and reviewers note the connection with Evelyn Waugh. During the novel's construction, it turned into a ghost story, focusing on a family of gentry who own a large country house they can no longer afford to maintain.

=== The Paying Guests (2014) ===
This novel is set in the 1920s, in the social and economic aftermath of World War I. Households are in reduced circumstances and Frances Wray and her mother have to take in lodgers to keep going. The developing lesbian relationship between Frances and lodger Lilian Barber provides a complex backdrop for a murder investigation that takes up the latter half of the book. The Observer said: "The inimitable Sarah Waters handles a dramatic key change with aplomb in her new novel set in 1920s south London". The Telegraph described it as "eerie, virtuoso writing".

== Honours and awards ==
Waters was named as one of Granta's 20 "Best of Young British Writers" in January 2003. The same year, she received the South Bank Award for Literature. She was named Author of the Year at the 2003 British Book Awards. In both 2006 and 2009 she won "Writer of the Year" at the annual Stonewall Awards. She was elected a Fellow of the Royal Society of Literature in 2009. She holds an honorary degree from Lancaster University. She has featured on the Pinc List of leading Welsh LGBT figures.

She was appointed Officer of the Order of the British Empire (OBE) in the 2019 Birthday Honours for services to literature.

Each of her novels has received awards as well.

=== Tipping the Velvet ===
- Betty Trask Award, 1999
- Library Journal's Best Book of the Year, 1999
- Mail on Sunday/John Llewellyn Rhys Prize (shortlist), 1999
- New York Times Notable Book of the Year, 1999
- Ferro-Grumley Award for Lesbian Fiction (shortlist), 2000
- Lambda Literary Award for Lesbian Fiction, 2000

=== Affinity ===
- Stonewall Book Award, 2001
- Wales Book of the Year (shortlist), 2000
- Ferro-Grumley Award for Lesbian Fiction Fiction, 2000
- Lambda Literary Award for Lesbian Fiction (shortlist), 2000
- Mail on Sunday/John Llewellyn Rhys Prize (shortlist), 2000
- Somerset Maugham Award, 2000
- Sunday Times Young Writer of the Year Award, 2000
- The Best Translated Crime Fiction of the Year in Japan, Kono Mystery ga Sugoi! 2004

=== Fingersmith ===
- Crime Writers' Association Ellis Peters Historical Dagger, 2002
- Man Booker Prize (shortlist), 2002
- Orange Prize for Fiction (shortlist), 2002
- British Book Awards Author of the Year, 2003
- The Best Translated Crime Fiction of the Year in Japan, Kono Mystery ga Sugoi! 2005

=== The Night Watch ===
- Man Booker Prize (shortlist), 2006
- Orange Prize for Fiction (shortlist), 2006
- Lambda Literary Award, 2007

=== The Little Stranger ===
- Man Booker Prize (shortlist), 2009
- Nominee for Shirley Jackson Award, 2009

=== The Paying Guests ===
- Baileys Women's Prize for Fiction (shortlist) 2015

== Bibliography ==
=== Non-fiction ===
- Waters, Sarah (1994). "'A Girton Girl on a throne' : Queen Christina and versions of lesbianism, 1906-1933". Feminist Review (46): 41–60. doi:10.2307/1395418. JSTOR 1395418.
- Waters, S. (1995). ""The Most Famous Fairy in History": Antinous and Homosexual Fantasy". Journal of the History of Sexuality. 6 (2): 194–230. JSTOR 3704122.
- Waters, Sarah (1995). Wolfskins and togas : lesbian and gay historical fictions, 1870 to the present (PhD thesis). Queen Mary, University of London. Archived from the original on 2 December 2022.
- Sandham, Ann ed. The Women Writers Handbook, Contributor. (2020) ISBN 978-1912430338

=== Novels ===
- Tipping the Velvet, 1998
- Affinity, 1999
- Fingersmith, 2002
- The Night Watch, 2006
- The Little Stranger, 2009
- The Paying Guests, 2014

=== Critical studies and reviews of Waters' work ===
- Hughes, Emma (10 September 2014). "[Untitled review of The paying guests]". Books. Country Life. 208 (37): 138.

== Adaptations ==
=== Television ===
- Tipping the Velvet (2002), BBC Two
- Fingersmith (2005), BBC One
- Affinity (2008), ITV1
- The Night Watch (2011), BBC Two

=== Stage ===
- Tipping the Velvet (2015)
- The Night Watch (2019)

=== Film ===
- The Handmaiden (2016)
- The Little Stranger (2018)
