= Tipping the Velvet =

1998 novel by Sarah Waters

- First edition cover
- Author: Sarah Waters
- Genre: Historical fiction, Theatre-fiction
- Publisher: Virago Press
- Publication date: 1998
- Publication place: United Kingdom
- Pages: 480 pp.
- ISBN: 978-1-86049-524-3
- OCLC: 778984140
- Followed by: Affinity

Tipping the Velvet is a 1998 debut novel by Welsh novelist Sarah Waters. A historical novel set in England during the 1890s, it tells a coming-of-age story about a young woman named Nan who falls in love with a male impersonator, follows her to London, and finds various ways to support herself as she journeys through the city. The picaresque plot elements have prompted scholars and reviewers to compare it to similar British urban adventure stories written by Charles Dickens and Daniel Defoe.

The novel has pervasive lesbian themes, concentrating on eroticism and self-discovery. Waters was working on a PhD dissertation in English literature when she decided to write a story she would like to read. Employing her love for the variety of people and districts in London, she consciously chose an urban setting. As opposed to previous lesbian-themed fiction she had read where the characters escape an oppressive society to live apart from it, Waters chose characters who interact with their surroundings. The book becomes a fictionalized account of lesbian relationships from that era. The main character's experiences in the theatrical profession and her perpetual motion through the city allow her to make observations on social conditions while exploring the issues of gender, sexism, and class difference.

Waters' first novel, it was highly acclaimed and was chosen by The New York Times and The Library Journal as one of the best books of 1998. Reviewers commented that Tipping the Velvet employs humour, adventure, and sexual explicitness to great effect. The novel was adapted into a three-part television series by the BBC in 2002.

== Inspiration and publication ==
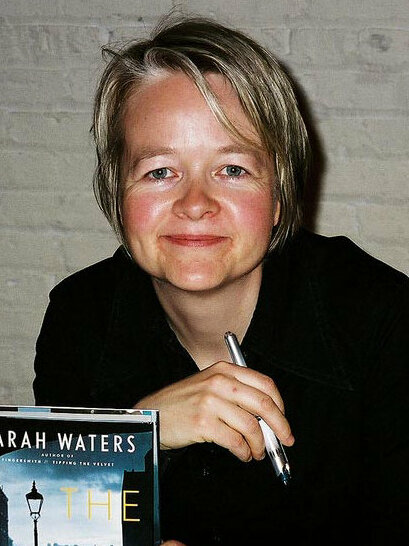
Waters at a book signing in 2006

When Sarah Waters was 19 years old, she joined a student house in Whitstable, Kent, sharing a bed and then falling in love with another young woman. They lived there for two winters in what became a six-year relationship. She recalled, "It was cold, isolated, romantic and so intense—quite special." In 1995, Waters was at Queen Mary and Westfield College writing her PhD dissertation on gay and lesbian historical fiction from 1870 onward when she became interested in the Victorian era. While learning about the activism in socialism, women's suffrage, and utopianism of the period, she was inspired to write a work of fiction of the kind that she would like to read. Specifically, Waters intended to write a story that focused on an urban setting, diverging from previous lesbian-themed books such as Isabel Miller's Patience and Sarah, in which two women escape an oppressive home life to live together freely in the woods. She said to herself at the time, "there's so much more to lesbian history than that".

Waters was drawn to the Victorian era because of the (mis)understandings of what social norms existed during the period. As she stated, "I find it a fascinating period because it feels very close to us, and yet in lots of ways it is utterly strange: many of the things we think we know about it are stereotypes, or simply wrong". Considering herself part of gay and lesbian literary heritage, Waters was influenced by Oscar Wilde, and Chris Hunt, who wrote Street Lavender, an historical novel with gay male themes also set in the Victorian era. She has stated that Tipping the Velvet is a female version of Street Lavender, with a plot similar to My Secret Life by "Walter".

Waters pitched Tipping the Velvet to ten British publishers, but after they all rejected it, she began considering American publishing houses. Although she was picked up quickly by a literary agency, the agent spent almost a year trying to sell the book to a mainstream publisher. By the time Tipping the Velvet was accepted by Virago Press—one of the ten that had previously passed on the project—Waters had already begun work on her second novel.

== Plot ==
Nancy "Nan" Astley is a sheltered 18-year-old living with her working-class family and helping in their oyster restaurant in Whitstable, Kent. She becomes instantly and desperately enamoured with a "masher", or male impersonator, named Kitty Butler, who performs for a season at the local theatre. They begin a friendship that grows when, after Kitty finds an opportunity to perform in London for better exposure, she asks Nan to join her. Nan enthusiastically agrees and leaves her family to act as Kitty's dresser while she performs. Although Kitty and Nan acknowledge their relationship to be sisterly, Nan continues to love Kitty until a jealous fight forces Kitty to admit she feels the same, although she insists that they keep their relationship secret. Simultaneously, Kitty's manager Walter decides that Kitty needs a performing partner to reach true success, and suggests Nan for the role. Nan is initially horrified by the idea, but takes to it. The duo become quite famous until Nan realises she is homesick after being gone from her family for more than a year. Her return home is underwhelming, so she returns to London early to find Kitty in bed with Walter. They announce that the act is finished and they are to be married.

Astonished and deeply bruised by the discovery, Nan wanders the streets of London, finally holing herself in a filthy boarding house for weeks in a state of madness until her funds run out. After spying the male costumes she took as her only memory of her time with Kitty, Nan begins to walk the streets of London as a man and easily passes. She is solicited by a man for sex and begins renting, but dressed only as a man for male clients, never letting them know she is a woman. She meets a socialist activist named Florence who lives near the boarding house, but before she can get to know her, Nan is hired by a wealthy widow with licentious tastes named Diana. Although realising—and initially enjoying—that she is an object to Diana and her friends, Nan stays with her for over a year as "Neville", dressed in the finest men's clothes Diana can afford. The relationship erodes, however, and Diana throws Nan into the streets.

Nan stumbles through London searching for Florence, whom she eventually finds; Florence is now melancholy, however, and has a child. Nan stays with Florence and her brother Ralph, working as their housekeeper. Nan and Florence grow closer during the year they live together, and Nan learns that the previous boarder with Florence and Ralph had a child and died shortly after giving birth. Florence was deeply in love with the boarder but her affections were not returned. During an outing to a women's pub, Nan is recognised by former fans, to Florence's astonishment, and Nan divulges her own spotty past to Florence. Cautiously, they begin a love affair. Putting her theatrical skills to use, Nan assists Ralph in preparing a speech at an upcoming socialist rally. At the event Nan jumps onstage to help Ralph when he falters, and is noticed once more by Kitty, who asks her to come back so they can continue their affair in secret. Realising how much shame Kitty continues to feel, how much of herself was compromised during their affair, and that her truest happiness is where she is now, Nan turns Kitty away and joins Florence.

== Literary elements ==
=== Style ===
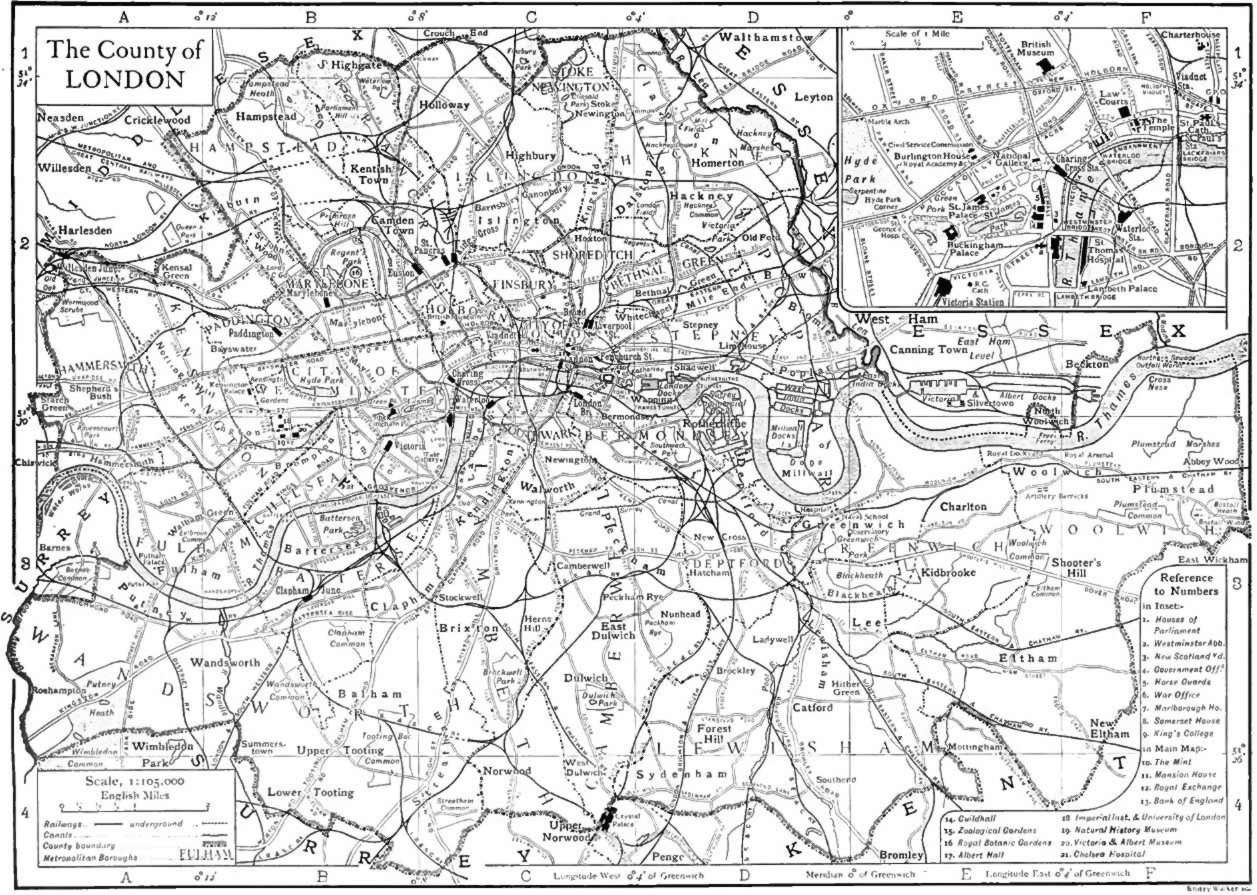
The story spans the London districts of Brixton, Smithfield, Leicester Square, St John's Wood and Bethnal Green, shown here in a map from 1911.

The greatest literary strengths in Tipping the Velvet, according to reviewers and literary scholars, are the vibrant portrayal of the districts and streets of London, and Waters' ability to create sympathetic and realistic characters. Her use of synaesthesia in lush descriptions particularly interested Harriet Malinowitz in The Women's Review of Books. For example, Malinowitz cites the scene when Nan first meets Kitty, removing her glove to shake Kitty's hand. Very much an oyster girl, Nan's hands are covered with "those rank sea-scents, of liquor and oyster-flesh, crab-meat and whelks, which had flavoured my fingers and those of my family for so many years we had ceased, entirely, to notice them". Nan is mortified that she smells like a herring, but Kitty assuages her fears, kissing her hand and telling her she instead smells like a mermaid. Malinowitz includes this and other descriptions of sights, sounds, and smells in Victorian London as examples of elements that are "breathlessly and wittily detailed".

Although Waters was born in Pembrokeshire, Wales, she considers herself a London writer because of her intense affection for the city, due in part to her immigration to it. Specifically, Waters is moved by walking through London and seeing remnants of many historical eras: "It's ... almost like it's peopled with ghosts—again, jostling up against each other or passing through each other. I find that very exciting". Her love for the city is apparent to many reviewers. In the Lesbian Review of Books Donna Allegra writes, "[S]he summons the era's attitudes and ambiance projecting them onto the screen of the reader's mind with Dolby wrap-around sound such that you feel you're vacationing on all points between Chelsea and the East End".

Miranda Seymour in The New York Times remarks on the "breathless passion" of the narrator's voice as being absolutely convincing, citing as an example Nancy's statement to her sister at the start of the book about why she continues to visit Kitty Butler:

... It's like I never saw anything at all before. It's like I am filling up, like a wine-glass when it's filled with wine. I watch the acts before her and they are like nothing—they're like dust. Then she walks on the stage and—she is so pretty; and her suit is so nice; and her voice is so sweet... She makes me want to smile and weep, at once... I never saw a girl like her before. I never knew that there were girls like her.

Donna Allegra and Christina Patterson in The Observer also praise Nan as a passionate and captivating character. Patterson and Mel Steel in The Independent compare her resourcefulness to that of Moll Flanders. Of her three Victorian-set novels, Waters uses humour and "an attractive lightness of touch" most effectively in Tipping the Velvet, according to Paulina Palmer. Nan the narrator describes the irony of her "curious gaslit career" as a rent-boy only to end up—in Diana's words—as her "tart". Waters had such fun writing the novel that she told Robert McCrum from The Observer in 2009 that if she had no obligations to meet stemming from her subsequent success as a writer that she would continue writing Nan's story.

=== Genre ===
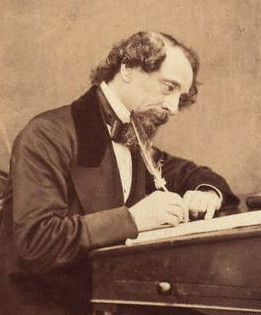
Waters responded to the many comparisons of her books to Charles Dickens' by saying "I'm not like Dickens... To write these faux Victorian novels is quite different."

Nan's path through the plot indicates that Tipping the Velvet is part Bildungsroman, and her journeys through the streets of London invoke elements of a picaresque novel. Scholar Emily Jeremiah characterises the story as a Bildungsroman: a coming-of-age adventure but one that far surpasses a simple coming-out story. Stefania Ciocia in Literary London writes that the plot has classical elements of a fairy tale as it follows the main character's growth and progression, and has a moral ending that includes a course of events where Nan forsakes three suitors for her—in this case—Princess Charming. Nan finds true love with Florence, who is a bit dowdy, somewhat stout, certainly not wealthy, and driven to improve the world; the least likely of all the characters. A review in Publishers Weekly states that the series of events leading to Nan finding love are "unpredictable and moving".

Nan's experiences eventually reveal serious faults of the society she moves through, the primary element of a picaresque novel. For this and other reasons, Waters' books are frequently compared to stories by Charles Dickens; the reader follows Nan's movement from sheltered naif to exuberant theatre performer to rent-boy to mistress to housewife then socialist orator, showing allegiance to none of these professions or ideals. Michael Upchurch in The Seattle Times writes that Nan's inability or unwillingness to adhere to any profession or setting, remaining malleable until the end of the novel indicates she is her own worst enemy. Likewise, Marianne Brace in The Independent considers Nan selfish and unsympathetic.

Ciocia writes that with half the novel taking place in theatrical settings, Nan may be playing a role as character in her own life or a play on a stage set in a theatre or the streets of London. She starts as a spectator watching Kitty onstage, and later with Kitty, watching how men move and behave to improve their act. She becomes a performer, with Kitty, as a renter and again for the predatory Diana and her friends. Finally she takes the role of director as she assists and impels Ralph to perform his speech. At this point, she is able to reconcile her identity and the story ends. Waters consciously chose to create a complicated plot, and was impressed with Iris Murdoch's claim that she herself had entire stories worked out well in advance of writing them, a method Waters used with Tipping the Velvet.

== Themes ==
=== Sexuality ===
Lesbianism is at the top of the agenda for my books because it's at the top of the agenda for my life. It would be bizarre not to write about it. —Sarah Waters

Sexuality and sexual identity is the most prevalent theme in the novel. The title is an obscure Victorian pornographic slang reference to cunnilingus. Nick Rennison in Contemporary British Authors characterises Tipping the Velvet as an "unabashed and unapologetic celebration of lesbian eroticism and sexual diversity". Donna Allegra writes with appreciation of how the existence of Waters' characters in a heterosexual existence forces an analysis of closeted positions. The sexism of the period puts a stranglehold on women, forcing readers to compare women in the Victorian era with present-day sexual attitudes. Nan never has difficulty accepting her love for Kitty Butler and other women; Kitty's union with Walter, however, "reeks of lesbophobia", according to Allegra. Music halls could be rough in some areas, but Kitty is shown handling drunken and rowdy audiences with humour and grace. The only instance where she is overcome and flees the stage is when a drunken patron shouts a euphemism for a lesbian at her. This episode leads to the final scene of Part I when Nan stumbles upon Kitty and Walter in bed. Kitty does not display any pleasure in their union, but rather complacence tinged with shame. Allegra compares Kitty's desire for normality overshadowing her desire for love with Nan to "compulsory heterosexuality ... emblematic of and particular to lesbian existence".

Scholar Paulina Palmer asserts that Waters, in Tipping the Velvet and her two following novels also set in the Victorian era—Affinity and Fingersmith—is establishing a literary tradition that has not existed: "Women engaging in same-sex relationships in the Victorian era were on the whole invisible and we have little knowledge of their literary interests." Waters, however, acknowledges that accuracy about lesbian life in the Victorian era is not her primary goal: "My purpose was not to be authentic, but to imagine a history that we can’t really recover." Short bursts of lesbian-themed literary activity occurred in 1920s with authors such as Natalie Clifford Barney and Djuna Barnes. Another surge of activity published as lesbian pulp fiction occurred in the 1950s and early 1960s, during which several notable lesbian authors such as Ann Bannon and Valerie Taylor helped to establish lesbian literary identity. These fictions helped to inform readers about the lives and cultural landmarks of lesbians when very little information existed. Waters states that she is not on a deliberate crusade to write about lesbians, but that it is a reflection of what she knows: "Lesbianism is at the top of the agenda for my books because it's at the top of the agenda for my life. It would be bizarre not to write about it." In 2009, as she reflected on her reasons for writing Tipping the Velvet and Fingersmith, Waters said she was searching for her own identity as a lesbian writer.

Among Waters' Victorian-set novels, depictions of sexual encounters are also, according to Palmer, the most vivid in Tipping the Velvet. A review in The Advocate calls the book "riotously sexy", and The Seattle Times suggests the scene where Nan shows Kitty how to open and eat an oyster is evocative of Tom Jones. This follows a marked difference in recently written fiction by and for lesbians. Frank depictions of lesbian sexuality specifically penned by women have been quieted by censorship that equated lesbian sex with aberrant mental behaviour, or employed it as an erotic element controlled by, and for the benefit of, men. Lesbian literary scholar Bonnie Zimmerman writes, "Lesbians have been reticent and uncomfortable about sexual writing in part because we wish to reject the patriarchal stereotype of the lesbian as a voracious sexual vampire who spends all her time in bed. It is safer to be a lesbian if sex is kept in the closet or under the covers. We don’t wish to give the world another stick with which to beat us".

=== Gender ===
Nan not only experiences a series of misadventures and lesbian relationships, but also shifts from female to male at the same time, giving the reader an opportunity to view London society from multiple perspectives. Gender masquerade and reaction to it permeates the novel. According to Harriet Malinowitz, Waters uses the symbolism of clothing such as skirts, pants, stays, braces, bonnets, ties, and chemises "with the sort of metaphorical significance that Melville gives to whales". Stefania Ciocia declares that in all of 19th-century English literature, the only type of character who was able to enjoy adventures native to the picaresque novel were males who acted as the observer or stroller, walking through the city from one district to the next. The single exception to this was Moll Flanders, a prostitute. Nancy Astley behaves as both, giving her the ability to offer her perceptions of London society as both a man and a woman.

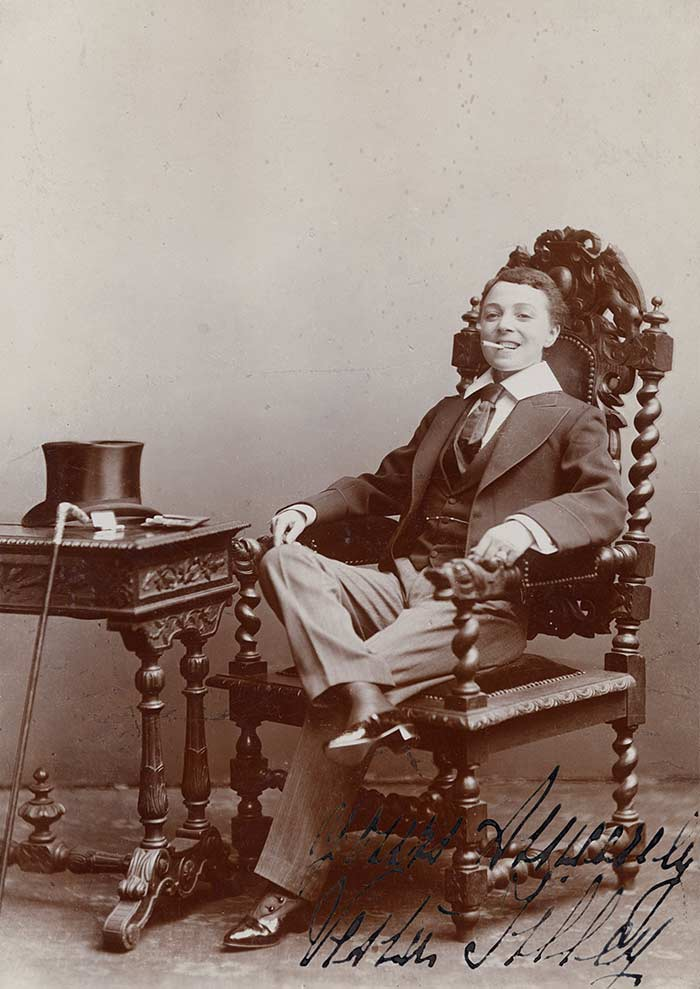
Vesta Tilley, here in costume, was one of the most popular male impersonators of her time.

Music halls, where both Nan and Kitty are employed—and put on display—as male impersonators, allow about half the novel's action and commentary on gender to take place, according to scholar Cheryl Wilson. When Nan puts on trousers for the first time to perform as Kitty's partner and realises the impact of their double act together, she states, "whatever successes I might achieve as a girl, they would be nothing compared to the triumphs I should enjoy clad, however girlishly, as a boy". Male impersonation is common in the world of the novel, and some performers are quite popular. Only certain types of depictions of men, however, were acceptable in reality. Nan and Kitty pretend to be London "swells": gentlemen on the town who sing about their sweethearts. Wilson provides evidence that such depictions were supported by class divisions, as poorer music hall patrons enjoyed the fun poked at the upper class, and the upper class generally found it harmless enough to laugh at themselves. Mashers such as the famed Vesta Tilley capitalised on the fact that both men and women were able to laugh at common perceptions of femininity and masculinity.

Writing in 1998 about a period more than 100 years before, Waters employs a continuity between the past and present, particularly as it relates to an outsider's view of sexuality and gender. Diana bestows Nan with the finest gift she had ever received, an expensive watch that requires no winding. She has nowhere to be except at Diana's beck and call, and never leaves Diana's mansion without her. Emily Jeremiah uses this as an example of how Tipping the Velvet fits Jack Halberstam's declaration that homosexual historiographies "produce alternative temporalities". Gay and lesbian stories do not use the same rites of passage that most mainstream stories do, leaving aside the importance of birth, marriage, reproduction, and death. This transcendence of time is evident in the narration of the novel. It is Nan's first-person account of her own past, told many years later. When Nan divulges her past to Florence, Waters uses the first line of the novel to signify where she begins, cycling the story.

Even the novel's language bridges this divide. Waters often employs the word "queer" to describe the unusual or remarkable, instead of its post-1922 connotation to refer to homosexuality. She also uses the term specifically to highlight what is unusual as it applies to gender, or Nan's own emotions toward Kitty. Nan's father uses the symbol of the oyster, what he calls a "real queer fish" that exhibits both male and female characteristics, and compares it to Kitty who sits before them in feminine attire though they have seen her on stage dressed as a man. The landlady of the boarding house where Kitty and Nan are staying appraises Nan's first male costume, and is troubled by the "queerness" of it because she looks too much like a man, instead of a woman pretending to be a man. Donna Allegra suggests that by using the contemporary term for prostitutes, "gay girls", Waters is winking at her readers.

=== Class ===
Starting as a working-class girl and experiencing music halls, prostitution, luxury, and a socialist struggle for utopia, Nan's journeys through the class system in Tipping the Velvet are as varied as her gender portrayals and love affairs. Aiobheann Sweeney in The Washington Post notes, "like Dickens, [Waters] digs around in the poorhouses, prisons and asylums to come up with characters who not only court and curtsy but dramatise the unfairness of poverty and gender disparity in their time".

Paulina Palmer sees the reading material available in the various locations of Nan's settings as symbols of the vast class differences in Victorian London. Specifically, Diana keeps a trunk full of pornographic literature which she and Nan read to each other in between sexual encounters. She is an extremely wealthy resident of the London neighbourhood St John's Wood, and identifies as a Sapphist—a contemporary term for a lesbian. Nan uses the euphemism "tom" throughout the novel, particularly to refer to herself and other working class lesbians. Although "tom" was used as a Victorian reference to lesbianism, Waters admits it was probably not as prevalent as her characters suggest it was.

Waters includes a historical reference to the medical profession starting to acknowledge and identify female homosexuality in the 19th century when a friend of Diana's named Dickie reads aloud during a party from a medical text describing the histories of several acknowledged lesbians, including Dickie's own. One story discussed among the wealthy women at the party is about a young woman with a large clitoris, which they consider congenital in lower-class women. They attempt to prove their point with Diana's maid Zena, but Nan prevents this humiliation, which precipitates her final rift with Diana. Using Dickie's book to strike Nan across the face, Diana gives her a black eye and bloody cheek before throwing her out into the street with Zena. Nan goes to Florence's house, which is filled with socialist literature. Although Diana is a supporter of women's suffrage, she discourages Nan from reading such literature, confiscating any political material Nan picks up. In contrast, Nan feels hopelessly uninformed when Florence and her friends engage in heated political debates. She asks questions, but feels stupid about not knowing the answers. Florence introduces her to the writings of Walt Whitman, Eleanor Marx, and Edward Carpenter, which they sexualise by using as an introduction to intimacy.

== Critical reception ==
Tipping the Velvet was critically acclaimed upon its release and Waters' writing style highly praised. Harriet Malinowitz wrote that the story is an "utterly captivating, high octane narrative" and Mel Steel of The Independent wrote, "Could this be a new genre? The bawdy lesbian picaresque novel? Whatever it is, take it with you. It's gorgeous". Kirkus Reviews also praised it, writing "Waters' debut offers terrific entertainment: swiftly paced, crammed with colorful depictions of 1890s London and vividly sketched Dickensian supporting characters", comparing the depiction of Nancy's parents to the fishing community in David Copperfield, and adding that it "pulsat[es] with highly charged (and explicitly presented) erotic heat". John Perry in The San Francisco Chronicle stated that it "has the qualities of an extravagantly upholstered armchair. Tricked out in gaudy fabric and yards of fringe, it offers a sensual experience that leaves the reader marveling at the author's craftsmanship, idiosyncrasy and sheer effort". Perry did acknowledge, however, that modern optimism was probably the impetus driving Waters' vision of a lesbian past.

Miranda Seymour in The New York Times wrote that the (American) cover is troubling, curious, titillating, and distant at once: a "clever preparation for the yearning opening pages".

Christina Patterson called Waters "an extremely confident writer, combining precise, sensuous descriptions with irony and wit in a skilled, multi-layered pastiche of the lesbian historical romance". Renee Graham's review in The Boston Globe characterised the novel's style as "plush and inviting—delicious, even". In The New York Times, Miranda Seymour drew attention to the scene when Nan dresses up as Hadrian's lover, the page Antinous who was drowned in the Nile, for a masquerade benefiting Diana's friends in a hedonistic bacchanalia that ends violently with Nan cast out of the house into the cold, highlighting it as a passage of "startling power".

Several reviewers compared Tipping the Velvet to Jeanette Winterson's Oranges Are Not the Only Fruit for a similar story of a woman's sexual awakening. Waters credits Winterson as an influence in lesbian writing, but states that the books are quite different and her writing is not like Winterson's at all. Waters suggests that reviewers have bracketed them together because Winterson was the only other lesbian author they could recall.

Tipping the Velvet won the Lambda Literary Award for lesbian fiction in 2000, and the Betty Trask Award, given to Commonwealth citizens who have produced their first novel before reaching the age of 35. The Library Journal chose it as one of their Best Books of the Year for 1999, and The New York Times included it on its list of Notable Books of the Year.

== Adaptations ==
=== Television ===
Tipping the Velvet was adapted into a BBC television drama serial of the same name, originally screened in three episodes on BBC Two in 2002. It was produced for the BBC by the independent production company Sally Head Productions, and starred Rachael Stirling as Nan, Keeley Hawes as Kitty, Anna Chancellor as Diana, and Jodhi May as Florence. The BBC had previously adapted Oranges Are Not the Only Fruit in 1990 and some other scenes in dramas to follow, but none had been so explicit. Sally Head Productions defended the decision to air the entire program uncut. Waters was quite surprised that the BBC chose to produce and broadcast a television adaptation that faithfully followed the relish and detail of sexual escapades in the book. Stirling thoroughly enjoyed the role, despite her avowed heterosexuality: "To counteract any hard-core sex within it, there's a huge sense of humour and a huge sense of fun and frivolity and joy of life. It was so utterly believable that you never for a moment thought, Fuck, there's no reason why I'm standing here naked."

Screenwriter Andrew Davies said he was attracted to the story because it featured a girl transitioning into womanhood and it included his interests in Victorian erotica; he compared it to Pride and Prejudice—for which he wrote the BBC screenplay—"with dirty bits". Both Waters and Davies were concerned about the use of dildos in scenes with Diana, but the BBC allowed it.

Waters especially appreciated the way Davies interpreted Kitty's ambivalence about being in love with Nan. He wrote the line for her, "I hate the way you make me feel", which according to Waters crystallises Kitty's complicated emotions well. The music in the adaptation was written for the film. Waters wrote song titles but not lyrics in the music references in the novel. For one song, during Kitty and Nan's first performance in the adaptation, Davies wrote a composition that had Kitty show Nan—dressed and performing as brothers—how to pick up girls in the park. It involved Kitty teaching Nan how to kiss, which they do onstage in front of audiences who are watching women, dressed as men, who are in reality having an affair with each other beyond the view of the audience. Waters wrote a similar description as Nan compares their act to their relationship; their sexual encounters to their performance onstage, noting the irony that Kitty insisted on absolute secrecy yet there they performed in front of thousands: "You are too slow—you go too fast—not there, but here—that's good—that's better! It was as if we walked before the crimson curtain, lay down upon the boards and kissed and fondled—and were clapped, and cheered, and paid for it!"

A persistent rumor in the mid-late 2000s claimed that a film adaptation of Tipping the Velvet was to be directed by Sofia Coppola, starring Beyoncé and Eva Longoria. However, both stars insisted that everything about the rumour is false, right down to quotes attributed to them.

In 2009, UK playwright Amanda Whittington wrote a stage adaptation of Tipping the Velvet. It was showcased by Guildhall School of Music and Drama at The Bridewell Theatre, London, in October 2009. Directed by Katharine Rogers, the production featured original music hall songs and was praised for its authentic interpretation of the novel.

=== Stage ===
On 14 April 2015, it was announced the play would receive its world premiere the same year and would begin previews at the Lyric Hammersmith on 18 September 2015, with an official opening night on 28 September, booking for a limited period until 24 October. Following its premiere production the play transferred to the Royal Lyceum Theatre, Edinburgh, as part of the 50th anniversary season of the Royal Lyceum Theatre company, where it ran from 28 October to 14 November 2015.

Tipping the Velvet has been adapted for the stage by Laura Wade and is directed by Lyndsey Turner, with choreography by Alistair David, design by Lizzie Clachan, lighting design by Jon Clark, music by Michael Bruce and sound by Nick Manning.

== Censorship ==
In April 2025, the Lukashenko regime added the book to the List of printed publications containing information messages and materials whose distribution could harm the national interests of Belarus.

== Citations ==
- References in Tipping the Velvet correspond to: Waters, Sarah (1 May 2000). Tipping the Velvet: A Novel: New York City: Riverhead Trade. ISBN 1-57322-788-9
