= Affinity (film) =

2008 film by Tim Fywell

- DVD cover
- Directed by: Tim Fywell
- Written by: Andrew Davies (screenwriter); Sarah Waters (novel)
- Produced by: Adrian Bate
- Starring: Zoë Tapper; Anna Madeley; Domini Blythe; Amanda Plummer; Mary Jo Randle
- Cinematography: Bernard Couture
- Edited by: Mary Finlay
- Music by: Frédéric Weber
- Release date: 2008
- Running time: 120 minutes
- Country: United Kingdom
- Language: English

Affinity is a 2008 British film adaptation of Sarah Waters' 1999 novel of the same name; directed by Tim Fywell and written by Andrew Davies. It stars Zoë Tapper, Anna Madeley, Domini Blythe, Amanda Plummer, and Mary Jo Randle. The film was nominated for the GLAAD Media Award for Outstanding TV Movie or Limited Series.

== Premise ==
Affinity is set in Victorian England; the story of an upper-class woman, Margaret (Anna Madeley), who becomes an official "Visitor" to a woman's prison; however, she becomes emotionally attached to one of the inmates, Selina (Zoe Tapper).

As the story progresses through Selina's shady background, and Margaret's dislike of her home life; a plot to break out of the prison develops. But just what the plan is, and who calls the shots is yet to be discovered.

== Cast ==
- Zoë Tapper as Selina Dawes
- Anna Madeley as Margaret Prior
- Domini Blythe as Mother Prior
- Amanda Plummer as Miss Ridley
- Mary Jo Randle as Mrs Jelf
- Caroline Loncq as Ruth Vigers
- Anne Reid as Mrs Brink
- Vincent Leclerc as Theophilus
- Anna Massey as Miss Haxby
- Ferelith Young as Helen
- Sara Lloyd-Gregory as Madeleine
- Brett Watson as Stephen Prior
- Candis Nergaard as Black Eyed Sue
- Kenneth Hadley as Prison Porter
- Sarah Crowden as Ada
- Nickolas Grace as Mr Hither
- Paul Clayton as Mr Vincy
