= A Harlot's Progress (film) =

2006 British television film

- Written by: Clive Bradley
- Directed by: Justin Hardy
- Starring: Toby Jones; Zoe Tapper; Sophie Thompson; Richard Wilson
- Theme music composer: Richard Blair-Oliphant
- Country of origin: United Kingdom
- Original language: English

Production
- Producers: Clare Alan; Lucy Bassnett-McGuire
- Cinematography: Douglas Hartington
- Editor: Michael Harrowes

Original release
- Network: Channel 4
- Release: 2 November 2006

A Harlot's Progress is a 2006 British television film directed by Justin Hardy and starring Zoe Tapper, Toby Jones, Sophie Thompson and Richard Wilson. The story is based on the series of paintings entitled A Harlot's Progress by William Hogarth. Hogarth's work is inspired by his interactions with an eighteenth-century prostitute Mary Collins. It originally aired on Channel 4 on 2 November 2006.

== Main cast ==
- Zoe Tapper - Mary Collins
- Toby Jones - William Hogarth
- Sophie Thompson - Jane Hogarth
- Richard Wilson - Sir James Thornhill
- Geraldine James - Madame Needham
