= Neil Blackmore =

British novelist

Neil Blackmore is a British novelist who had a success in Germany and other countries in the 1990s and 2000s with his first two novels, Soho Blues and Der Himmel über Damaskus. These books were published to great success and critical strength and Neil Blackmore toured all over the country of Germany, where his books sold very well. The books were also published in the United Kingdom (Der Himmel über Damaskus under the title of Split My Heart there). In the UK the books were published by Orion House and were less successful than in some other countries. But his books were given very good reviews by newspapers. Neil Blackmore was one of the first writers to have a writing blog, starting in the late 1990s. Bright Red, his website centered on his blog (not then called so), was one of the best known writing sites of the time, known for its humour and honesty. In 2000 The Independent newspaper named it one of the best websites on writing.

Blackmore told German fans that he had stopped writing for some years and had been travelling the world and living in London as a freelance writer. He is currently listed as a member of the long-running North London Writers circle , along with Sarah Waters and Charles Palliser.

In an extensive interview about his career with Monocle Radio at the publication of Radical Love, he explained why he had stopped publishing for many years and his reservations about being a novelist.

In 2019, Penguin Books announced they would publish Blackmore's third novel The Intoxicating Mister Lavelle in 2020, having acquired World English rights. This novel was shortlisted for the Polari Prize. Blackmore published The Dangerous Kingdom of Love in 2021 and then Radical Love in 2023, to widespread acclaim, including The Times newspaper saying it "confirms Blackmore as one of the most original voices in historical fiction today."
