= The Private Life of Samuel Pepys =

2003 British comedy TV film

The Private Life of Samuel Pepys is a 2003 British comedy television film directed by Oliver Parker and starring Steve Coogan, Lou Doillon and Nathaniel Parker. It portrays the historical diarist Samuel Pepys. It was aired on BBC Two on 16 December 2003, drawing an audience of 2.9 million viewers.

== Cast ==
- Steve Coogan as Samuel Pepys
- Lou Doillon as Elizabeth Pepys
- Andrew Harrison as Clerk of the Court
- Alex Hassell as Balty
- Andy Linden as John Jones
- Ciarán McMenamin as Will Hewer
- Guy Moore as Captain John Scott
- Simon Munnery as Mad Solomon
- Leon Ockenden as Pembleton
- Nathaniel Parker as Charles II
- Tim Pigott-Smith as Lord Shaftesbury
- Miranda Raison as Deb Willet
- Sally Rogers as Betty Bagwell
- Zoë Tapper as Jane
- Danny Webb as Edward Montagu
