= Bad Behaviour (1993 film) =

- Directed by: Les Blair
- Written by: Les Blair
- Produced by: Sarah Curtis; Sally Hibbin
- Starring: Stephen Rea; Sinéad Cusack; Philip Jackson; Clare Higgins
- Cinematography: Witold Stok
- Edited by: Martin Walsh
- Music by: John Altman
- Distributed by: First Independent Films
- Release date: 11 February 1993 (Berlin International Film Festival)
- Running time: 104 minutes
- Country: United Kingdom
- Language: English
- Budget: £1.05 million
- Box office: £83,669

Bad Behaviour is a 1993 British comedy film directed by Les Blair and starring Stephen Rea, Sinéad Cusack and Philip Jackson. The film depicts an Irish couple living with their family in North London.

== Cast ==
- Stephen Rea as Jerry McAllister
- Philip Jackson as Howard Spink
- Sinead Cusack as Ellie McAllister
- Phil Daniels as The Nunn Brother
- Clare Higgins as Jessica Kennedy
- Syra Todd as Sophie Bewan
- Joe Coles as Michael McAllister
- Luke Blair as Joe McAllister
- Amanda Boxer as Linda Marks
- Mary Jo Randle as Winifred Turner
- Kenneth Hadley as Priest
- Ian Flintoff as Chairperson
