= The Little Stranger (film) =

- Theatrical release poster
- Directed by: Lenny Abrahamson
- Written by: Lucinda Coxon
- Based on: The Little Stranger by Sarah Waters
- Produced by: Gail Egan; Andrea Calderwood; Ed Guiney
- Starring: Domhnall Gleeson; Ruth Wilson; Will Poulter; Charlotte Rampling
- Cinematography: Ole Bratt Birkeland
- Edited by: Nathan Nugent
- Music by: Stephen Rennicks
- Production companies: Potboiler Productions; Dark Trick Films; Element Pictures; Film4; Pathé
- Distributed by: Pathé Distribution (France); 20th Century Fox (United Kingdom/Ireland)
- Release dates: 21 September 2018 (United Kingdom & Ireland)
- Running time: 111 minutes
- Countries: Ireland; United Kingdom; France
- Language: English
- Box office: $1.8 million

The Little Stranger is a 2018 gothic drama film directed by Lenny Abrahamson and written by Lucinda Coxon, based on the 2009 novel of the same name by Sarah Waters. The film stars Domhnall Gleeson, Ruth Wilson, Will Poulter and Charlotte Rampling. Set in 1948, the plot follows a doctor who visits an old house where his mother used to work, only to discover it may hold a dark secret. The film was released in the United Kingdom on 21 September 2018 and in the United States on 31 August 2018 by Focus Features, receiving positive reviews from critics.

== Plot ==
In 1940s Warwickshire, Dr. Faraday is called to visit a sick maid at the dilapidated Hundreds Hall. The maid confesses to faking and hopes the doctor will send her home. The Hall now belongs to Roderick Ayres, a scarred Royal Air Force veteran severely burned in the Second World War, who is being nursed by his sister, Caroline. Dr. Faraday recalls during his childhood in 1919 visiting the house, where his beloved mother had once been a maid to the grand Ayres family. He once broke an acorn from an elaborate plaster carving, to his mother's anger, in view of young Susan, the Ayres' first daughter, known as Suki.

There are intermittent noises occurring in the house, alarming Caroline, Mrs. Ayres and the maid. The servants' bells sound without anyone ringing them. A 19th century tube communication device linking the empty nursery to the kitchen also begins to sound inexplicably. When Mrs. Ayres goes upstairs to investigate, she is suddenly locked in the nursery. Experiencing shadowy figures and strange banging noises, Mrs. Ayres, in a frantic attempt to escape, breaks the windows, cutting both arms. After the others in the household rescue her from the room, she comes to believe that Suki's ghost is always nearby.

Not long afterwards, Mrs. Ayres kills herself by slashing her wrists with the glass from a broken picture frame. Roderick attends the funeral, admonishing Caroline to leave the house lest she might be the next to die. On the night of the funeral, Faraday and a reluctant Caroline make plans to marry in six weeks' time. Later, Faraday considers that the strange occurrences in the house may well be due to poltergeist activity. It is suggested that supernatural phenomena might be the product of random, unintended telekinesis, which may well be poltergeist-like activity caused by a living person (as opposed to a dead one).

Caroline eventually breaks off her engagement to Dr. Faraday, insisting that she would not be happy married to him, and expressing her intention to sell Hundreds Hall. Faraday insists that she is merely exhausted and not thinking clearly.

One night, Faraday has a house call that keeps him off-premises. When he finally arrives home, he learns that Caroline has fallen from the second floor to her death.

At the inquest into Caroline's death, the maid reports that she awoke to hear Caroline going upstairs to investigate a strange noise in the hall. She also reports hearing Caroline cry out "You!," immediately before falling to her death. After Dr. Faraday testifies that Caroline's mind was undoubtedly "clouded," the coroner declares the death to be a suicide. The court concurs.

Months later, Faraday visits the Ayres home while it is up for sale, having kept the keys which Caroline gave him. As he leaves the premises, the lifelike spectre of a young Faraday standing at the top of the staircase (where Caroline fell) solemnly watches him before backing away into the darkness.

== Cast ==
- Domhnall Gleeson as Dr. Faraday
- Ruth Wilson as Caroline Ayres
- Will Poulter as Roderick Ayres
- Liv Hill as Betty
- Charlotte Rampling as Mrs Ayres
- Harry Hadden-Paton as Dr David Granger
- Anna Madeley as Anne Granger
- Richard McCabe as Dr Seeley

Other actors who appear in the film in minor roles include Sarah Crowden, Elizabeth Counsell, Clive Francis, Kate Phillips, Oliver Chris, Nicholas Burns, Charlie Anson, Josh Dylan, Lloyd Hutchinson, Lorne MacFadyen, Maggie McCarthy, Ann Firbank and Camilla Arfwedson, with child actors Oliver Zetterstrom and Tipper Seifert-Cleveland also appearing in the film as young Dr. Faraday and Susan "Sukie" Ayres, respectively.

== Production ==
In September 2015, it was announced that Lenny Abrahamson would direct an adaptation of Sarah Waters' supernatural drama novel The Little Stranger, scripted by Lucinda Coxon, in which Domhnall Gleeson would play the lead role of Dr Faraday. On 5 May 2017, Ruth Wilson was reportedly cast as the female lead. On 23 May 2017, Focus Features acquired the worldwide distribution rights to the film, excluding four territories: France and Switzerland, where Pathé would be distributing, and the Republic of Ireland and the United Kingdom where 20th Century Fox would be distributing for Pathé. Will Poulter and Charlotte Rampling were also cast in the film, which was produced by Egan, Andrea Calderwood and Ed Guiney. The film was developed by Potboiler Productions, Film4 Productions, Element and Dark Trick.

Principal photography on the film began on 6 July 2017 in the UK and took place in different locations outside London, including Winslow in Buckinghamshire and Yorkshire, for about ten weeks.

== Theatrical run ==
The film was released in the United States on 31 August 2018 and in the United Kingdom on 21 September 2018.

In its opening weekend in the United States, the film made $417,000 from 474 cinemas, an average of $880 per venue. In its opening weekend in the UK and Ireland, it grossed £294,900 from 296 sites, an average of under £1,000 per cinema.

== Reception ==
On review aggregation website Rotten Tomatoes, the film holds an approval rating of 65% based on 141 reviews, with an average rating of 6.5/10. The website's critical consensus reads, "The Little Stranger's reliance on atmosphere may satisfy audiences in the mood for sophisticated horror fare — while frustrating those seeking more visceral thrills." On Metacritic, the film has a weighted average score of 67 out of 100, based on 36 critics, indicating "generally favorable reviews".
