= The Night Watch (Waters novel) =

2006 novel by Sarah Waters

- UK first edition cover
- Author: Sarah Waters
- Cover artist: TWBG – Duncan Spilling; Lettering: Stephen Raw
- Language: English
- Genre: Historical fiction
- Publisher: Virago
- Publication date: 2 Feb 2006 (UK)
- Publication place: United Kingdom
- Media type: Print (hardback & paperback)
- Pages: 480 pp
- ISBN: 1-84408-246-6
- OCLC: 62265716

The Night Watch is a 2006 historical fiction novel by Sarah Waters. It was shortlisted for both the 2006 Man Booker Prize and the 2006 Orange Prize. The novel, which is told backward through third-person narrative, takes place in 1940s London during and after World War II. The storyline follows the fragmented lives and the strange interconnections between Kay, Helen and Julia, three lesbians; Viv, a straight woman; and Duncan, her brother, whose sexuality is ambiguous. The war, with its never-ending night watches, serves as a horrifying backdrop and metaphor of the morbidity that surrounds life and love.

== Plot summary ==
The novel begins in 1947 with Kay Langrish, a woman broken by the war. She spends her days locked in her room in London, her only human contact being with another lesbian, Mickey. One night, Viv appears and hands Kay a gold ring.

Viv works as an assistant to Helen, who runs a match-making agency near Bond Street. When Helen's girlfriend Julia doesn't come home one night, Helen is overcome with worry and jealousy. After work, Viv has dinner with her brother Duncan and Duncan's roommate, an older gentleman named Mr Mundy.

Helen and Viv receive an unexpected visit from Robert Fraser, Duncan's old cellmate. Viv dismisses Fraser, feeling as though he thinks she and her father haven't done enough to help Duncan's situation and explains that he simply doesn't know everything.

Duncan accompanies Mr Mundy, or "Uncle Horace," as he refers to him in public, to his Christian Science doctor at Lavender Hill. After having dinner with his sister, Duncan works at the candle factory. When he leaves work, Duncan is surprised to see Fraser waiting for him at the gates. He invites Duncan to a pub by the water, and Duncan reluctantly agrees, mainly because he doesn't want Mr Mundy to worry. Fraser makes several calls at Duncan's for dinner. One night, however, he doesn't show up, and Duncan is quite upset, while Mr Mundy is relieved. Duncan decides to find Fraser, leaving Mr Mundy home alone.

The novel moves back three years, to 1944. Duncan has been imprisoned in Wormwood Scrubs for three years now, and Viv and her father visit him once a month. Viv is working as a typist and lodges at a boarding house with some of her co-workers. She meets Reggie, who is married, at anonymous hotels once every five weeks, whenever Reggie is permitted leave from Wales. When her "friend" is late, Viv realizes that she must be pregnant, and hesitates to tell Reggie.

Kay works as an emergency response ambulance worker, cleaning up after air raids. One night, Kay and her coworker Mickey are sent out to take a woman to the hospital as she miscarries. On the same night, Kay learns of an air raid that occurred on her street. Kay panics and runs to the rubble to where her flat used to be, and cries thinking Helen is dead.

Helen works for the government in a division that assists those who've lost their belongings in the war. By chance she runs into Julia, a woman who was once acquainted with Kay. On her birthday, Helen is restless and alone at home, and decides to leave for Julia's flat. They take a walk, and when another air raid alarm sounds, they run and hide from the chaos. Nights later, she realizes she's late to go home from Julia's, and they hurry back to Helen and Kay's flat.

The action shifts back another three years, to 1941. On a crowded train, Viv meets a soldier named Reggie, who tells her he is stuck in an unhappy marriage. Duncan and his friend Alec are angry at their families and the government when Alec receives his service papers. They decide to make a statement with deadly consequences. Kay and Mickey respond to an emergency call.

== Awards ==
- Man Booker Prize for Fiction (shortlist), 2006
- Orange Prize for Fiction (shortlist), 2006
- Lambda Literary Award for Lesbian Fiction, 2007

== TV-movie adaptation ==
On 25 November 2010, BBC Two announced the cast for the 90-minute television adaptation of The Night Watch. It was adapted by Paula Milne and directed by Richard Laxton and was broadcast on 12 July 2011 on BBC Two.

Cast:

- Anna Maxwell Martin as Kay Langrish
- Claire Foy as Helen Giniver
- Jodie Whittaker as Viv
- Harry Treadaway as Duncan Pearce
- Anna Wilson-Jones as Julia Standing
- Tom Weston-Jones as Jack Brown
- JJ Feild as Robert Fraser
- Liam Garrigan as Reggie
- Claudie Blakley as Nancy
- Kenneth Cranham as Mr Mundy
