= Harriet Malinowitz =

American academic scholar

- Born: Harriet Malinowitz
- Occupations: Academic, Professor of English, Scholar
- Writing career
- Genres: queer theory, ethnography, rhetorical studies, liberatory pedagogy
- Notable works: Textual Orientations:Lesbian and Gay Students and the Making of Discourse Communities

Harriet Malinowitz is an American academic scholar specializing in lesbian and gay issues in higher education, women's studies, the rhetoric of Zionism and Israel/Palestine, and writing theory and pedagogy.

== Life and work ==
Former professor of English at Long Island University, Malinowitz is currently Lecturer in Women's and Gender Studies at Ithaca College. She earned her Ph.D. in Rhetoric and Composition from New York University.

Notable works by Malinowitz include Textual Orientiations: Lesbian and Gay Students and the Making of Discourse Communities (Heinemann, 1995), an ethnographic study focusing on the community emerging in a college course that examines lesbian and gay experience. Textual Orientations highlights the productive intersections of two academic fields: rhetoric and composition and lesbian and gay studies while providing a pedagogical model that values the "vantage point of the social margin."

Malinowitz is also a writer of lesbian stand-up comedy, most notably for her partner Sara Cytron's shows A Dyke Grows in Brooklyn and Take My Domestic Partner--Please!

She has taught at the CUNY School of Professional Studies and Hunter College.

== Selected bibliography ==
=== Books ===
- Malinowitz, Harriet (1995). Textual Orientations: Lesbian and Gay Students and the Making of Discourse Communities. Portsmouth, NH: Boynton/Cook Publishers: Heinemann.

=== Book chapters ===
- Malinowitz, Harriet. (016). "Liberal Human 'Rights' Discourse and Sexual Citizenship." In Alexander, Jonathan; Rhodes, Jacqueline (eds.) Sexual Rhetorics. Routledge, 2016.
- Malinowitz, Harriet (2008). "The Writer-passion of a Feminist Dilettante". In Siebler, Kay (ed.). Composing Feminism(s). Cresskill, NJ: Hampton Press.
- Malinowitz, Harriet (1998). "A Feminist Critique of Writing in the Disciplines". In Jarratt, Susan; Worsham, Lynn (eds.). Feminism and Composition Studies: In Other Words. New York: Modern Language Association of America.
- Malinowitz, Harriet (1996). "Lesbian Studies and Postmodern Queer Theory". In Zimmerman, Bonnie; McNaron, Toni A. H. (eds.). The New Lesbian Studies: Into the Twenty First Century. New York: Feminist Press.
- Malinowitz, Harriet (1990). "The Rhetoric of Empowerment in Writing Programs". In Lunsford, Andrea; Moglen, Helene; Slevin, James F. (eds.). The Right to Literacy. New York: Modern Language Association of America.

=== Articles ===
- Malinowitz, Harriet (2015). "Torches and Metonyms of Freedom". The Writing Instructor (Special issue: Queer and now).
- Malinowitz, Harriet (January 2003). "Business, Pleasure, and the Personal Essay". College English. 65 (3): 305–322. doi:10.2307/3594260. JSTOR 3594260.
- Malinowitz, Harriet (2002). "Unmotherhood". JAC. 22 (1): 11–36.
- Malinowitz, Harriet (September 1999). "Textual Trouble in River City: Literacy, Rhetoric, and Consumerism in The Music Man". College English. 62 (1): 58–82. doi:10.2307/378899. JSTOR 378899.
- Malinowitz, Harriet (1996). "David and Me". JAC. 16 (1): 209–223.
