= Affinity (novel) =

1999 historical fiction novel by Sarah Waters

- First edition (p/b)
- Author: Sarah Waters
- Genre: Historical fiction
- Publisher: Virago
- Publication date: 1999
- Publication place: United Kingdom
- Media type: Print (Paperback)
- Pages: 368
- ISBN: 1-86049-691-1
- OCLC: 40714318

Affinity is a 1999 historical fiction novel by the Welsh novelist Sarah Waters. It is the author's second novel, following her debut Tipping the Velvet. Set during 1870s Victorian England, it tells the story of a woman, Margaret Prior, who is haunted by a shadowy past and in an attempt to cure her recent bout of illness and depression, begins visits to the women's wards of Millbank Prison. Whilst there she becomes entranced by the spiritualist Selina Dawes. Written as an epistolary novel, the story alternates as a series of diary entries written by both main characters.

Like her first novel, Affinity contains overarching lesbian themes, and was acclaimed by critics on its publication.

== Premise ==
Margaret Prior (also called "Peggy" and "Aurora"), an unmarried woman from an upper-class family, visits the Millbank Prison in 1870s Victorian-era England. Margaret is generally unhappy, recovering from her father's death and her subsequent suicide attempt, and struggling with her lack of power living at home with her over-involved mother despite being almost 30. To counter this, she becomes a "Lady Visitor" of the prison's female wards, hoping to escape her troubles and be a guiding figure in the lives of the female prisoners. On her first visit she is entranced by the sight of a young woman with a flower, who reminds her of a Carlo Crivelli painting. She learns that this woman is Selina Dawes, who is a somewhat infamous medium of spirits jailed two years previously for the apparent death of the lady with whom she resided. After their early discussions, Margaret begins to confide in Selina details of her past, and learn more about spiritualism; before long, the relationship evolves and appears to take on a life of its own...

== Characters ==
=== Protagonists ===
- Margaret Prior, the protagonist. Margaret is from an upper-class family that resides in Chelsea, London, and begins to visit Millbank some months after attempting suicide following her father's death.
- Selina Dawes, a medium of spirits who is jailed after the wealthy woman she lives with (Mrs Brink) dies suddenly after witnessing a sitting Selina is taking with another wealthy young woman in their home.

=== London, 1874 ===
These characters appear in Margaret's diary entries.

- Mrs Prior, Margaret's mother.
- Stephen Prior, Margaret's brother.
- Helen Prior, Margaret's sister-in-law who is married to Stephen. It is heavily implied that she and Margaret were lovers prior to the novel's plot and Magaret's suicide attempt.
- Priscilla "Pris" Prior, Margaret's younger sister who is due to be married at the start of the novel.
- Mr Arthur Barclay, the man engaged to Priscilla and later her husband.
- Mrs Wallace, a wealthy friend of Mrs Prior's.
- Mr Wallace, Mrs Wallace's husband.
- Mr Hither, a spiritualist and curator of the British National Association of Spiritualists.
- Ellis, the Prior's housekeeper.
- Boyd, a servant girl at the Prior's.
- Vigers, a servant girl at the Prior's who replaces Boyd after her departure from the house.
- Mr Cornwallis, a painter who is producing a portrait of Priscilla for her engagement.

=== London, 1872 ===
These characters appear in Selina's diary entries.

- Mrs Brink, of Sydenham, London, who takes in Selina as her ward.
- Peter Quick, a 'spirit' who uses Selina as his medium.
- Miss Madeleine Silvester, the girl in the sitting with Selina who is witnessed as being hysterical by Mrs. Brink shortly before her death.
- Ruth, a servant girl at Mrs Brink's who is loyal to Selina.
- Mr Vincy, the owner of a spiritualist boarding house and Selina's landlord in Holborn prior to her moving in with Mrs. Brink.
- Miss Sibree, a fellow spiritualist who lodges with Selina in Holborn.
- Mrs Vincy, Mr Vincy's wife.

=== Millbank ===
- Mr Shillitoe, the warden of Millbank Prison who encourages Margaret to become a visitor.
- Miss Haxby, principal matron and governess of the female section of the prison.
- Miss Ridley, chief matron.
- Miss Manning, a matron on wards A and B.
- Mrs Pretty, a stout, heavy matron who looks after the maximum security prisoners.
- Mrs Jelf, a kindly matron who looks after Second Class, First Class and Star Class prisoners on Selina's ward.
- Susan Pilling, a prisoner on Miss Manning's ward the first prisoner Margaret meets at Millbank.
- Ellen Power, an elderly fellow prisoner on Selina's ward.
- Mary Ann Cook, a fellow prisoner on Selina's ward. Her name may have been inspired by the serial killer Mary Ann Cotton.
- Agnes Nash, a prisoner who was found guilty of coin counterfeiting.
- Jane Jarvis, a fellow prisoner on Selina's ward; formerly a prostitute.
- Emma White, a prisoner on B ward.
- Miss Craven, a matron.
- Mr Dabny, the prison chaplain.
- Miss Brewer, the clerk to the chaplain.

== Reception ==
=== Awards and citations ===
- Arts Council of Wales Book of the Year Award (shortlist), 2000
- Ferro-Grumley Award for Lesbian and Gay Fiction, 2000
- Lambda Literary Award for Fiction (shortlist), 2000
- Mail on Sunday/John Llewellyn Rhys Prize (shortlist), 2000
- Somerset Maugham Award, 2000
- Stonewall Book Award (American Library Association GLBT Roundtable Book Award), 2000
- Sunday Times Young Writer of the Year Award, 2000
- This Mystery is Excellent! (trans: Kono Mystery ga Sugoi!) Best Translated Crime Fiction in Japan, 1st Place, 2004

== Film adaptation ==
The novel was adapted into a screenplay by Andrew Davies. A feature film based on Davies' adaptation of Affinity premiered on 19 June 2008 at the opening night of Frameline, the San Francisco International LGBT Film Festival, at the Castro Theater.

The film was first shown on ITV1 in the United Kingdom on 28 December 2008.

== Quotes ==
'It is a world that is made of love. Did you think there is only the kind of love your sister knows for her husband? Did you think there must be here, a man with whiskers, and over here, a lady in a gown? Haven't I said, there are no whiskers and gowns where spirits are? And what will your sister do if her husband should die, and she should take another? Who will she fly to then, when she has crossed the spheres? For she will fly to someone, we will all fly to someone, we will all return to that piece of shining matter from which our souls were torn with another, two-halves of the same. It may be that the husband your sister has now has that other soul, that has the affinity with her soul – I hope it is. But it may be the next man she takes, or it may be neither. It may be someone she would never think to look to on the earth, someone kept from her by some false boundary...'

— Selina Dawes

== Translations ==
Year	Language	Title
2013	Czech	Náklonnost
2012	Korea	끌림
2009	Chinese	半身
2006	Dutch	Affiniteit
2006	Hebrew	זרעים של חיבה
2005	Swedish	Livstråden
2005	Taiwan	華麗的邪惡
2004	French	Affinités
2004	Italian	Affinità
2004	Russian	Нить, сотканная из тьмы (издательство: Росмэн-Пресс)
2004	Polish	Niebanalna więź
2002	German	Selinas Geister
