= Stephen Fry bibliography and filmography =

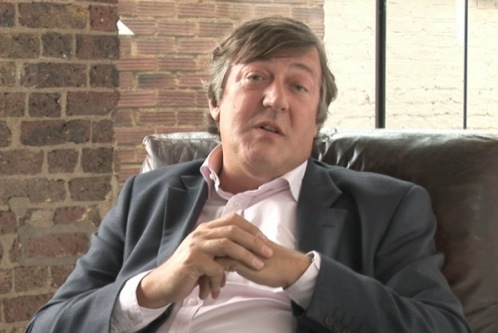
Fry in Happy Birthday to GNU (2008)

Stephen Fry is an English actor, comedian, author and television presenter. With Hugh Laurie, as the comedy double act Fry and Laurie, he co-wrote and co-starred in A Bit of Fry & Laurie, and the duo also played the title roles in Jeeves and Wooster. Fry played the lead in the film Wilde, played Melchett in the Blackadder television series, and was the host of celebrity comedy trivia show QI. He has contributed columns and articles for newspapers and magazines, and has written four novels and three autobiographies, Moab Is My Washpot, The Fry Chronicles, and More Fool Me: A Memoir.

== Written works ==
=== Films and screenplays ===
Year	Title	Notes
2003	Bright Young Things	Nominated – British Independent Film Awards; Nominated – Emden International Film Festival
2006	The Magic Flute	English translation of the libretto

=== Musicals ===
Year	Title	Notes
1984	Me and My Girl	Adapted from Lupino Lane's script

=== Books ===
Year	Title	Notes
1992	The Liar	
1992	Paperweight	Collection of Articles
1994	The Hippopotamus	
1996	Making History	Alternate history Won – Sidewise Award for Alternate History
1997	Moab Is My Washpot	Autobiography
2000	The Stars' Tennis Balls	Revenge: A Novel in the US; Fry's take on The Count of Monte Cristo
2002	Rescuing the Spectacled Bear: A Peruvian Diary	
2004	Stephen Fry's Incomplete and Utter History of Classical Music	Ghostwritten by Tim Lihoreau
2005	The Ode Less Travelled: Unlocking the Poet Within	
2008	Stephen Fry in America	
2010	The Fry Chronicles: An Autobiography	Autobiography
2014	More Fool Me: A Memoir	Autobiography
2017	Mythos: A Retelling of the Myths of Ancient Greece	Greek Myths series
2018	Heroes: Mortals and Monsters, Quests and Adventures	Greek Myths series
2020	Troy: Our Greatest Story Retold	Greek Myths series
2021	Fry's Ties	
2024	Odyssey	Greek Myths series

=== Plays ===
Year	Title	Notes
1979	Latin! or Tobacco and Boys	Included in Paperweight; Won – Fringe First at the 1980 Edinburgh Festival Fringe.
2007	Pantomime Cinderella	Performed at the Old Vic at Christmas.

=== Published television scripts ===
- 1990: A Bit of Fry & Laurie
- 1991: A Bit More Fry & Laurie
- 1992: 3 Bits of Fry & Laurie
- 1995: Fry & Laurie Bit No. 4

== Performances ==
=== Film ===
Year	Title	Role	Notes
1981	Chariots of Fire	Singer in H.M.S. Pinafore	Uncredited
1985	The Good Father	Creighton	
1988	A Handful of Dust	Reggie	
1988	A Fish Called Wanda	Hutchison	
1992	Peter's Friends	Peter Morton	
1994	IQ	James Moreland	
1995	Cold Comfort Farm	Mybug	
1995	The Steal	Wimborne	
1996	The Wind in the Willows	The Judge	
1997	Wilde	Oscar Wilde	Won – Golden Space Needle Award for Best Actor; Nominated – Golden Globe for Best Performance by an Actor – Motion Picture Drama; Nominated – Satellite Award for Best Performance by an Actor in a Motion Picture – Drama
1997	Spice World	Judge	
1997	Live from the Lighthouse	Host	
1998	The Tichborne Claimant	Hawkins	
1998	A Civil Action	Pinder	
1999	Whatever Happened to Harold Smith?	Dr. Peter Robinson	
1999	The Nearly Complete and Utter History of Everything	Ambassador / Modern Man	
1999	The Comedy Trail: A Shaggy Dog Story	Himself	TV special
2000	Best	Frazer Crane	
2000	Relative Values	Frederick Crestwell	
2000	Sabotage	Lord Wellington	
2001	Four Play	Nigel Steele	
2001	The Discovery of Heaven	Onno	
2001	Gosford Park	Inspector Thompson	Won – Broadcast Film Critics Association Awards for Best Acting Ensemble; Won – Florida Film Critics Circle Awards for Best Ensemble Cast; Won – Online Film Critics Society Awards for Best Ensemble; Won – Phoenix Film Critics Society Awards for Best Acting Ensemble; Won – Satellite Award for Outstanding Motion Picture Ensemble; Won – Screen Actors Guild Award for Outstanding Performance by a Cast in a Motion Picture
2002	Thunderpants	Sir Anthony Silk	
2003	Bright Young Things	Chauffeur	Also director/writer/executive producer
2003	Le Divorce	Piers Janely	
2004	Tooth	Pedro	
2004	The Life and Death of Peter Sellers	Maurice Woodruff	
2005	MirrorMask	Librarian	
2005	The Hitchhiker's Guide to the Galaxy	Narrator/The Guide	Voice only
2005	A Cock and Bull Story	Patrick Curator/Parson Yorick	
2006	V for Vendetta	Deitrich	
2006	Stormbreaker	Smithers	
2007	Eichmann	Minister Tormer	
2007	St Trinian's	Himself	
2007	Snow White: The Sequel	The Narrator	Voice only: English language version
2008	Tales of the Riverbank	Owl	
2009	House of Boys	Dr. Marsh	
2010	Alice in Wonderland	Cheshire the Cheshire Cat	Voice only
2010	Animals United	Socrates	Voice only: English language version
2011	Benjamin Sniddlegrass and the Cauldron of Penguins	The Narrator	Voice only
2011	Sherlock Holmes: A Game of Shadows	Mycroft Holmes	
2011	Summer Night, Winter Moon	Rufus	
2012	A Liar's Autobiography: The Untrue Story of Monty Python's Graham Chapman	Oscar Wilde	Voice only
2012	Clovis Dardentor	Mr. Eustache	
2013	The Hobbit: The Desolation of Smaug	Master of Lake-town	
2014	The Hobbit: The Battle of the Five Armies	Master of Lake-town	
2015	The Man Who Knew Infinity	Sir Francis Spring	
2016	Alice Through the Looking Glass	Cheshire the Cheshire Cat	Voice only
2016	Love & Friendship	Mr Johnson	
2018	The Con Is On	Sidney	Direct-to-VOD
2018	Duck Duck Goose	Frazier	Voice only
2019	Missing Link	Lord Piggot-Dunceby	Voice only
2019	Greed	Himself	
2023	The Inventor	Leonardo da Vinci	Voice only
2023	Red, White & Royal Blue	King James III	
2023	The Canterville Ghost	Sir Simon de Canterville	Voice only
2024	Treasure	Edek	
2025	A Friend of Dorothy	Dickie	Short film
2026	Touché	Narrator	Voice only
2026	Frank and Percy †		Post-production
2026	Hexed †	Elias Quire	Voice only; In-production
TBA	Red, White & Royal Wedding †	King James III	Post-production

=== Documentaries ===
Year	Title	Notes
1999	Bill Bryson: Notes from a Small Island	One episode
2005	Comedy Connections: A Bit of Fry & Laurie	
2006	Stephen Fry: The Secret Life of the Manic Depressive	Won International Emmy Award for Best Documentary
2006	Who Do You Think You Are?	One episode
2007	Stephen Fry: HIV and Me	
	Stephen Fry: Guilty	
2008	Blackadder's Most Cunning Moments	
2008	Blackadder: The Whole Rotten Saga	
2008	Blackadder Rides Again	
2008	The Machine That Made Us	Presenter; also known as Stephen Fry & the Gutenberg Press
2008	Stephen Fry in America	
2009	Last Chance to See	Follow up to Douglas Adams' 1989 radio series and 1990 book, with Fry replacing Adams as presenter.
2010	Stephen Fry on Wagner	Also known as Wagner & Me
2010	Fry and Laurie Reunited	
2011	Stephen Fry's 100 Greatest Gadgets	One of the 100 Greatest strand
2011	Fry's Planet Word	Five-part documentary series exploring language
2012	Gadget Man	Replaced by Richard Ayoade after the first series
2013	Stephen Fry: Out There	
2013	Stephen Fry's Key to the City	
2014	Hidden Kingdoms	Narrator
2015	A Life on Screen – Stephen Fry	
2015	Stephen Fry in Central America	
2016	The Not So Secret Life of the Manic Depressive: 10 Years On	
2017	50 Years Legal	Appear
2017–2019	EasyJet: Inside the Cockpit	Narrator
2020	Stephen Fry's 21st Century Firsts	Presenter
2022	Fantastic Beasts: A Natural History	Presenter
2022	A Year on Planet Earth	Presenter
2023	Dinosaur with Stephen Fry	Presenter
2023	Stephen Fry: Willem & Frieda – Defying the Nazis	Presenter
2024	Stephen Fry into Ukraine	

=== Television ===
Year	Title	Role	Notes
1980	University Challenge	Contestant	
1982	There's Nothing to Worry About!	Various	
1982	Cambridge Footlights Revue	Various Characters	Also writer TV movie
1983	The Crystal Cube	Dr. Adrian Cowlacey/Various Roles	Also writer TV movie
1983–1984	Alfresco	Various	
1984	The Young Ones	Lord Snot	
1985	Happy Families	Doctor De Quincy	
1986–1999	The Blackadder series: Blackadder II (1986); Blackadder the Third (1987); Blackadder: The Cavalier Years (1988); Blackadder's Christmas Carol (1988); Blackadder Goes Forth (1989); Blackadder: Back & Forth (1999)	Various members of the Melchett family throughout history, though he plays Arthur Wellesley (the Duke of Wellington) in Blackadder the Third and a couple scenes in Blackadder: Back & Forth.	
1987	First Aids	Doctor / Mr. Hasselblad	with Hugh Laurie
1987	Filthy Rich & Catflap	P'Farty	
1987	The Laughing Prisoner	No. 2	Also writer TV movie
1987, 1989, 1990, 1992, 1996	A Bit of Fry & Laurie	Himself, Various Roles	4 seasons
1988, 1997	Whose Line Is It Anyway?	Himself	
1988	This Is David Lander	David Lander	
1989	The New Statesman	Piers Lonsdale	
1990–1993	Jeeves and Wooster	Jeeves	23 episodes
1992	The Common Pursuit	Humphrey Taylor	
1993	Stalag Luft	Wing Commander James Forrester	TV movie
1995	The Thin Blue Line	Brigadier Blaster Sump	Series 1, episode 6, "Kids Today"
1995	Laughter and Loathing	Juvenal	TV movie
1997	They Think It's All Over	Himself (guest panellist)	
1998	In the Red	Controller, Radio 2	
1999–2000	Watership Down	Cowslip (voice)	Series 1 and 2 only
2000	Gormenghast	Professor Bellgrove	Episodes 3 and 4
2002	Surrealissimo: The Trial of Salvador Dalí	André Breton	TV movie
2003–2016	QI	Host	Fry was replaced by Sandi Toksvig
2003, 2005	Absolute Power	Charles Prentiss	
2004	A Bear Named Winnie	Protheroe the Zookeeper	TV movie
2005	Tom Brown's Schooldays	Dr. Thomas Arnold	TV movie
2005–2007, 2025-present	Pocoyo	Narrator	Animated children's programme Series 1-2, Series 5 (part 2)-present
2006	Extras	Himself	Episode: "Chris Martin"
2007	Shrink Rap	Himself	Quasi-therapeutic interview conducted by Pamela Stephenson
2007–2009	Kingdom	Peter Kingdom	18 episodes
2007–2017	Bones	Dr. Gordon Gordon Wyatt	6 episodes
2010	Little Crackers	Headmaster	10 minute short film
2011	Derren Brown: The Experiments	Himself	Episode 1: "The Assassin"
2011	March of the Dinosaurs	Narrator	
2012–2015	Peter Rabbit	Mr. Tolly (voice)	
2012	Doors Open	Professor Gissing	TV movie Also executive producer
2014	24: Live Another Day	Prime Minister Alastair Davies	8 episodes
2014, 2019	American Dad!	Mr Cavendish / John Michael Heaton (voice)	2 episodes
2014–2018	Lily's Driftwood Bay	Lord Stag (voice)	
2015–2019	Danger Mouse	Colonel K (voice)	
2016–2017	The Great Indoors	Roland	13 episodes
2016	Yonderland	Cuddly Dick	
2017	The Mr. Peabody & Sherman Show	Uncle Duke (voice)	Episode: "P-Bro/First Canine Police Force"
2017	Veep	Nikolai Genidze	Episode: "Georgia"
2017	Neo Yokio	Principal (voice)	
2018	Apple & Onion	Onion's Dad (voice)	2 episodes
2019	Mickey and the Roadster Racers	Dr Waddleton Crutchley (voice)	Episode: "Shennanygan"
2019	The Big Narstie Show	Guest	Season 2, episode 7
2020	Doctor Who	C	Episode: "Spyfall"
2020	Sex Education	Quiz Host/Himself	Cameo appearance
2020	It's Pony	Marcello Marvello (voice)	Episode: "Delivery Pony/Magic Annie"
2020	The Big Night In	Lord Melchett	Part of Children in Need and Comic Relief's special, appearing alongside Prince William on a video call.
2021	It's a Sin	Arthur Garrison	2 episodes
2021	The Simpsons	Terrance, Head of MI5 / Terrance's Father / Hazel (voice)	Episode: "The Man from G.R.A.M.P.A."
2022–2024	Heartstopper	Headmaster Barnes (voice)	5 episodes
2022	The Dropout	Ian Gibbons	4 episodes
2022–2025	The Sandman	Fiddler's Green / Gilbert	6 episodes
2023	The Morning Show	Leonard Cromwell	Season 3
2023	Everything Now	Dr Nell	Season 1
2023	Stephen Fry's Alternative Christmas Message	Himself / Presenter	
2024	Jeopardy!	Host	British, and later Australian, versions
2025	Star Wars: Skeleton Crew	Supervisor (voice)	2 episodes
2025	Harley Quinn	Brainiac (voice)	8 episodes
2025	Too Much	Simon Remen	2 episodes
2025	The Celebrity Traitors	Himself	Contestant; series 1
2025	Finding Father Christmas	Himself	TV movie

=== Theatre ===
Year	Play	Notes
1988	The Common Pursuit	Humphrey Taylor
1995	Cell Mates	George Blake
2005	The Likes of Us	Narrator
2012	Twelfth Night	Malvolio
2023	Bleak Expectations	Sir Philip Bin
2025	The Importance of Being Earnest	Lady Bracknell

=== Radio shows ===
- Hitchhiker's Guide to the Galaxy: Quandary Phase: Murray Bost Henson, BBC Radio 4
- Saturday Night Fry (1988, BBC Radio 4, six episodes)
- A Bit of Fry & Laurie (1994, BBC Radio Four, two half-hour programmes compiled from selected previously-seen sketches from the TV series)
- Absolute Power, BBC Radio Four
- Occasional guest panellist on I'm Sorry I Haven't a Clue, BBC Radio Four
- Regular guest panellist on Just a Minute, BBC Radio Four
- Has a regular slot, The Incomplete and Utter History of Classical Music on Classic FM
- Played the lead, David Lander, on Radio 4 series Delve Special
- A series of "wireless essays", supposedly by his alter ego, the elderly Cambridge philology professor Donald Trefusis, were featured in the BBC Radio 4 programme Loose Ends, hosted by Ned Sherrin
- Fry contributed regular parodies of BBC Radio 1's Newsbeat to the same station's arts programme Studio B15
- Afternoon Play: I Love Stephen Fry (2008, BBC Radio Four)
- Fry's English Delight (10 series, 2008–2019, BBC Radio Four)
- Stephen Fry on the Phone (2011, BBC Radio Four, five episodes)
- Warhorse of Letters, with Daniel Rigby (2011, BBC Radio Four, 12 episodes across 3 series)

=== Audiobooks ===
- Moab Is My Washpot (1997) ISBN 1-85686-268-2
- Paperweight Volume 1 (1998) ISBN 978-1-85686-296-7
- Harry Potter series, UK versions (1999–2007)
- The Hippopotamus (2000) ISBN 1-84197-129-4
- Montmorency (2004) ISBN 978-1-84440-025-6
- The Hitchhiker's Guide to the Galaxy (2005) ISBN 1-4050-5397-6
- Higher Ground Project (2005) ISBN 1-84458-643-X
- The Ode Less Travelled (2006) ISBN 1-85686-842-7
- Paperweight Volume 2 (2007) ISBN 978-1-85686-501-2
- The Best of Paddington on CD: Complete & Unabridged (2008) ISBN 0-00-716169-7
- Stephen Fry Presents a Selection of Anton Chekhov's Short Stories (Unabridged) (2008)
- Stephen Fry Presents a Selection of Oscar Wilde's Short Stories (Unabridged) (2008)
- The Dongle of Donald Trefusis (Podcasts, 2009)
- The Fry Chronicles: An Autobiography (2010)
- The Enormous Crocodile (2013)
- Sherlock Holmes: The Definitive Collection (2017)
- Paddington and the Christmas Surprise (2020)
- Paddington and the Grand Tour (2022)
- Paddington in the Garden (2022)
- Paddington: The Original Story of the bear from Peru (2022)
- Paddington at the Palace (2022)
- Paddington at the Circus (2022)

=== Audio dramas ===
- The Hound of the Baskervilles (2021) as Dr. Watson

=== Video games ===
- Harry Potter and the Chamber of Secrets (2002)
- Harry Potter and the Philosopher's Stone (2003)
- Harry Potter and the Prisoner of Azkaban (2004)
- Harry Potter and the Goblet of Fire (2005)
- Fable II (2008) – Reaver
- LittleBigPlanet (2008) – Narrator
- LittleBigPlanet (2009) – Narrator
- Fable III (2010) – Reaver
- LittleBigPlanet 2 (2011) – Narrator
- LittleBigPlanet PS Vita (2012) – Narrator
- LittleBigPlanet Karting (2012) – Narrator
- PlayStation All-Stars Battle Royale (2012) – Narrator (from LittleBigPlanet)
- LittleBigPlanet 3 (2014) – Narrator
- Destiny 2: Warmind (2018) – Concierge AI

=== Miscellaneous ===
- Fry has a guest appearance in a webcast of Doctor Who called Death Comes to Time, as Time Lord, the Minister of Chance.
- He does the voice of the telephone in the Direct Line adverts alongside Paul Merton, who voices the mouse.
- Fry introduced the television show Wildlife SOS.
- He provided voiceovers for Argos' Christmas adverts in 2007.
- He is the character in the Twinings Earl Grey tea adverts on British TV.
- He performs the voice of "Jeeves" for Voco Clocks' Clocks That Talk.
- He performs on the Bonzo Dog Doo-Dah Band's 2007 album, Pour l'Amour des Chiens.
- Fry appeared in a 2008 video entitled Freedom Fry — "Happy birthday to GNU", celebrating the GNU's 25th birthday.
- He provided his voice for the outro of YouTube videos by Charlotte McDonnell, used since 2009.
- He recites "50 Words for Snow" off Kate Bush's 2011 album of the same name.
- Fry is also the narrator on the show Pocoyo for seasons 1–2. His first Pocoyo episode he narrated was the pilot episode "Umbrella, Umbrella" and his final Pocoyo episode he narrated was the season 2 finale "Remember When".
- Fry provided narration for the Harry Potter 20th Anniversary: Return to Hogwarts reunion special.

== Directorial filmography ==
- Bright Young Things (director, 2003)
