= List of awards and nominations received by Stephen Fry =

Sir Stephen Fry awards and nominations
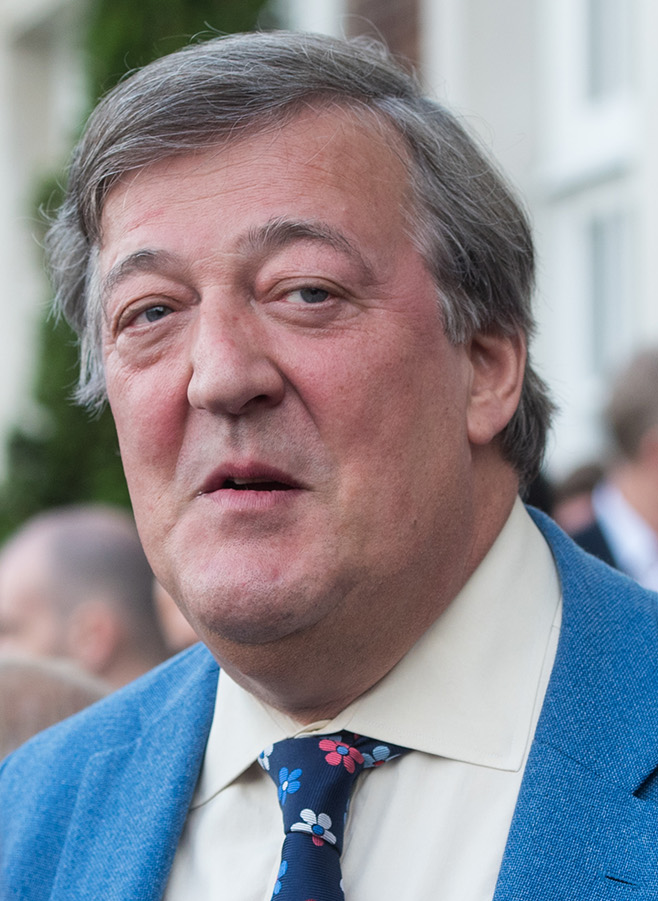
- Fry in 2016
Awards and nominations
Award	Wins	Nominations
BAFTA Awards	0	11
Golden Globes	0	1
Grammy Awards	0	2
Tony Awards	0	2
SAG Awards	1	1

Totals (Note: Certain award groups do not simply award one winner. They acknowledge several different recipients, have runners-up, and have third place. Since this is a specific recognition and is different from losing an award, runner-up mentions are considered wins in this award tally. For simplification and to avoid errors, each award in this list has been presumed to have had a prior nomination.)
- Wins: 8
- Nominations: 46

This article is a List of awards and nominations received by Sir Stephen Fry

Sir Stephen Fry is an English actor, comedian, author, presenter, and playwright. Known for his extensive roles and works on stage and screen, he has received various accolades including a Screen Actors Guild Award as well as nominations for 11 BAFTA Awards, a Golden Globe Award, a Grammy Award and Tony Award.

As a presenter and host of the popular BBC quiz show QI from 2003 to 2016, he received six nominations for the British Academy Television Award for Best Entertainment Performance. He starred in the two part documentary series Stephen Fry: The Secret Life of the Manic Depressive (2006) for which he was nominated for the British Academy Television Award for Best Factual Series or Strand. He helmed over the docu-series Stephen Fry and the Gutenberg Press earning a nomination for the British Academy Television Award for Best Specialist Factual.

As an actor, he portrayed author Oscar Wilde in the Brian Gilbert directed biographical romantic drama film Wilde (1998) for which he was nominated for the Golden Globe Award for Best Actor – Motion Picture Drama nomination. He also narrated, Oscar Wilde: The Selfish Giant & The Nightingale And The Rose earning a nomination for the Grammy Award for Best Spoken Word Album for Children. Fry portrayed a clueless but affable police inspector in the Robert Altman directed British ensemble murder mystery film Gosford Park (2001), for which he won alongside the ensemble the Screen Actors Guild Award for Outstanding Cast in a Motion Picture and the Critics' Choice Movie Award for Best Acting Ensemble.

For his work on the Broadway stage he received two Tony Award nominations, one for Best Book of a Musical for Me and My Girl in 1987 and another for Best Featured Actor in a Play for his performance as Malvolio in the revival of William Shakespeare's Twelfth Night in 2014.

Aside from being given Knighthood from King Charles III in 2025, Fry was also made a Grand Commander of the Order of the Phoenix by the President of Greece in 2021. Fry has been honored with several other accolades including the National Television Special Recognition Award in 2010, the British LGBT Lifetime Achievement Award in 2019, and the Global Icon Award at the Newport Beach Film Festival in 2025. He is an Elected Fellow at both the Royal Society of Literature and the Royal Society of Arts and has received Honorary Degrees from several institutions including the University of Dundee, the University of East Anglia, Anglia Ruskin University, the University of Sussex and KU Leuven, Belgium.

== Major associations ==
=== BAFTA Awards ===
Year	Category	Nominated work	Result	Ref.
British Academy Television Awards
2004	Best Entertainment Performance	QI	Nominated	
2005	Best Entertainment Performance	QI	Nominated	
2007	Best Entertainment Performance	QI	Nominated	
2007	Best Factual Series	Stephen Fry: The Secret Life of the Manic Depressive	Nominated	
2008	Best Entertainment Performance	QI	Nominated	
2009	Best Specialist Factual	Stephen Fry and the Gutenberg Press	Nominated	
2009	Best Entertainment Performance	QI	Nominated	
2010	Best Entertainment Performance	QI	Nominated	
2011	Best Entertainment Performance	QI	Nominated	
2012	Best Performer	LittleBigPlanet 2	Nominated	
2016	Entertainment Performance	QI	Nominated	

=== Critics' Choice Awards ===
Year	Category	Nominated work	Result	Ref.
Critics' Choice Movie Awards
2001	Best Acting Ensemble	Gosford Park	Won	

=== Golden Globe Awards ===
Year	Category	Nominated work	Result	Ref.
1999	Best Actor in a Motion Picture – Drama	Wilde	Nominated	

=== Grammy Awards ===
Year	Category	Nominated work	Result	Ref.
2002	Best Spoken Word Album for Children	Oscar Wilde: The Happy Prince and Other Tales	Nominated	
2023	Album of the Year	Music of the Spheres	Nominated	

=== Screen Actors Guild Awards ===
Year	Category	Nominated work	Result	Ref.
2001	Outstanding Ensemble Cast in a Motion Picture	Gosford Park	Won	

=== Tony Awards ===
Year	Category	Nominated work	Result	Ref.
1987	Best Book of a Musical	Me and My Girl	Nominated	
2014	Best Featured Actor in a Play	Twelfth Night	Nominated	

== Miscellaneous awards ==
Association	Year	Category	Nominated work	Result	Ref.
British Comedy Awards	2007	Best Entertainment Performance	QI	Nominated	
British Comedy Awards	2012	Best Entertainment Performance	QI	Nominated	
British Independent Film Awards	2003	Douglas Hilcox Award	Bright Young Things	Nominated	
Emden International Film Festival	2004	Emden Film Award	Bright Young Things	Nominated	
Florida Film Critics Circle	2001	Best Acting Ensemble	Gosford Park	Won	
Phoenix Film Critics Society	2001	Best Acting Ensemble	Gosford Park	Nominated	
Satellite Awards	1998	Best Actor in a Motion Picture Drama	Wilde	Nominated	
Satellite Awards	2001	Best Acting Ensemble	Gosford Park	Won	
Seattle International Film Festival	1998	Best Actor	Wilde	Won	
Sidewise Award for Alternate History	1998	Best Long Form	Making History	Won	

== Honorary awards ==
Organizations	Year	Award	Result	Ref.
British Broadcasting Corporation (BBC)	2006	Ranked sixth for Top Living Icon Award	Honored	
Radio Times	2006	Voted "Most Intelligent Man on Television"	Honored	
Independent on Sunday	2007	Named the 2nd most influential gay person in Britain	Honored	
Broadcast Magazine	2007	Listed #4 in its "Hot 100" list of influential on-screen performers	Honored	
British Comedy Awards	2007	Lifetime Achievement Award	Honored	
The Noël Coward Society	2009	Vice-President	Honored	
Royal College of Psychiatrists	2009	Honorary Fellow	Honored	
Cardiff University	2010	Honorary Fellow	Honored	
Queens' College, Cambridge	2010	Honorary Fellow	Honored	
National Television Awards	2010	Special Recognition Award	Honored	
Harvard University (Note: Specifically, the Humanist Chaplaincy at the Harvard Secular Society and the American Humanist Association)	2011	Outstanding Lifetime Achievement Award in Cultural Humanism	Honored	
Union of UEA Students	2012	Honorary Life Membership of the Union	Honored	
British LGBT Awards	2016	Global Icon (Note: Nominated alongside the likes of Cher, Lady Gaga, and Sir Ian McKellen, the later of which won the award)	Nominated	
British LGBT Awards	2019	Lifetime Achievement	Honored	
Royal Society of Literature	2019	Elected Fellow	Honored	
President of Greece	2021	Grand Commander of the Order of the Phoenix	Honored	
Society of Authors	2023	Fellow	Honored	
Royal Canadian Geographical Society	2024	Honorary Fellow	Honored	
King Charles III	2025	Knight Bachelor	Honored	
Newport Beach Film Festival	2025	Global Icon Award	Honored	
Royal Society of Arts	N/A	Elected Fellow	Honored	

== Honorary degrees ==
Institution	Year	Degree	Result	Ref.
University of Dundee	1995	LL.D. (Doctor of Laws)	Honored	
University of East Anglia	1999	D.Litt. (Doctor of Letters)	Honored	
Anglia Ruskin University	2005	D.Univ. (Doctor of the University)	Honored	
University of Sussex	2021	D.Univ. (Doctor of the University)	Honored	
KU Leuven, Belgium	2025	Honorary Doctorate (Arts)	Honored	
