= Stephen Fry's Podgrams =

Podcast hosted by Stephen Fry

- The title screen for the first series of Stephen Fry's Podgrams.
- Genre: Comedy
- Format: Audio
- Language: British English

Cast and voices
- Hosted by: Stephen Fry

Production
- Length: 5:52 – 51:46

Technical specifications
- Audio format: MP3

Publication
- No. of seasons: 2
- No. of episodes: 9
- Original release: 20 February 2008 – 21 July 2009
- Provider: The Positive Internet Company
- Updates: Discontinued

Related
- Website: http://www.stephenfry.com

Stephen Fry's Podgrams was a podcast performed and recorded by British comedian, actor, director, and author Stephen Fry. First made downloadable on 20 February 2008, the series of podgrams is a collection of Fry's writings, speeches and collective thoughts. The podgrams vary in length and are not released at any set date.

The podgrams were one of the most downloaded podcast series on the internet, and appeared in the top five most downloaded podcasts from iTunes. Critical reception has been positive, as reviewers found the podgrams interesting and engaging.

== Content ==
The subject of Stephen Fry's Podgrams differs from episode to episode. Normally, each podgram begins with an update from Fry about what he has been doing recently, his activities since the last podgram, and any housekeeping that he needs to do concerning his website. Fry then continues to discuss his recent activities; although in other editions the introduction leads into the main subject. The text of the podgrams is sometimes published as part of Fry's web logs, or "Blessays".

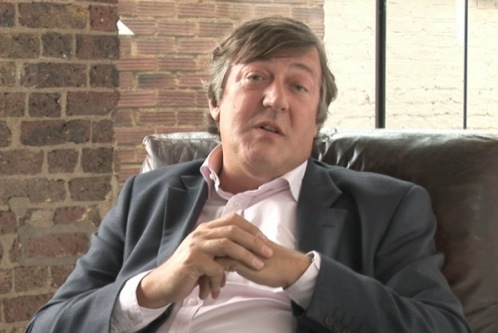
Stephen Fry

Fry's podgrams consist of anecdotes, such as how he broke his arm while filming a documentary in Brazil. He has also presented lectures, discussed certain themes in detail, or argued against things he sees as being wrong in today's society. In discussing his hatred of dancing, he said of music, "I do not want to use it as an exercise track for a farcical, meaningless, disgusting, brainless physical public exhibition of windmilling, gyrating and thrashing in a hot, loud room or hall." The material is usually original for each podcast, but he may revisit topics that he has previously discussed. For example, one podgram consisted of a speech he had previously made concerning public service broadcasting. His apologetic explanation for the repeated subject matter described his busy life, and he stated that the podgram was "all I can offer you."

== Reception ==
Stephen Fry's Podgrams have been well received by most critics. The series was listed of the top five most downloaded podcasts on iTunes, and were called "one of the world's most popular podcasts."

Chris Campling of The Times said that Fry was smug, "but then he has a lot to be smug about, not least the ability to waffle for 30 to 45 minutes about not very much without being boring or condescending." The Good Web Guide also recommends the series, saying that "whether he is bringing you up to date with his recent adventures of just riffing on something that interests him, he is always compelling company." The guide also states, "Stephen Fry is one of those very rare people who are incapable of being boring," and Nate Lanxon of CNET described the podgrams as "remarkably entertaining."

Jacques René Zammit of The Malta Independent reviewed one episode in which Fry talked about the problems within journalism. Zammit wrote positively on Fry's comments saying, "I share Stephen's worries completely. Every time I sit down to type my excessively long column, I am burdened by the thought that after all this is just a collection of thoughts by someone who may very well be perceived as a pompous ass – and if Stephen Fry has these disquisitions, then I definitely should be doing some worrying myself."

Chris Maume of The Independent responded negatively to the podcast, saying that it contains "amiable burblings" and has a "distinctly musty whiff about it."

Jo Roy sampled Stephen Fry's discussion of his hatred for dancing and used it as the soundtrack to a dance video.

== Episodes ==
The podgrams are released sporadically, with gaps between different podgrams being from one month up to several months. The length of each podgram varies widely as well. The second series began after Fry's website was revamped.

=== Series 1 ===
No.	Title	Length (minutes:seconds)	Original release date
1	"Broken Arm"	25:00	20 February 2008
Fry discusses how he broke his arm while filming a documentary series in South America, and the subsequent journey of healing.
2	"Bored of the Dance"	26:08	7 March 2008
While filming a documentary about America, Fry talks about the musical history of the country, which leads him to talk about his loathing of dancing.
3	"Wallpaper"	25:32	9 April 2008
Fry continues his journey across the United States, and talks about Oscar Wilde's view that America is so violent because the wallpaper is so ugly.
4	"Broadcasting"	41:04	25 June 2008
Because Fry has been so busy and has nothing new to talk about, he repeats a speech he previously made concerning his views on the future of public service broadcasting.
5	"Compliance Defiance"	19:50	2 September 2008
Fry talks about the problems within journalism, before launching a rant against compliance rules in television programmes.

=== Series 2 ===
No.	Title	Length (minutes:seconds)	Original release date
1	"Stephenfry.com 2.0"	7:24	15 October 2008
Fry tells his listeners about how his website is being updated, along with several upcoming changes.
2	"Beauty of Soul: Oscar Wilde"	5:52	3 December 2008
Fry talks about his love of Oscar Wilde. This podgram was partly an advert for his audio series of "Oscar Wilde's Short Stories".
3	"Language"	33:09	22 December 2008
Fry discusses his love of language and dislike of pedants.
4	"iTunes Live Festival"	51:46	21 July 2009
This edition is a speech Fry made concerning peer-to-peer file sharing.

== See also ==
- Stephen Fry
- Stephen Fry bibliography and filmography
- List of British comedians
