= More Fool Me =

More Fool Me may refer to:

- "More Fool Me", a song by the band Genesis released in 1973 on the album Selling England by the Pound
- More Fool Me (memoir), the 2014 autobiography of Stephen Fry (his third)
