= More Fool Me (memoir) =

Third autobiography of Stephen Fry

More Fool Me: A Memoir
- Author: Stephen Fry
- Language: English
- Genre: Autobiography
- Publisher: Michael Joseph
- Publication date: 25 September 2014
- Publication place: United Kingdom
- Pages: 400 pp
- ISBN: 0-7181-7978-1
- Preceded by: The Fry Chronicles: An Autobiography

More Fool Me: A Memoir is a 2014 volume of autobiography by Stephen Fry. The book continues the account of his earlier adult life given in 2010's The Fry Chronicles: An Autobiography, itself preceded by the account of his pre-university life contained in his 1997 publication Moab Is My Washpot: An Autobiography. More Fool Me contains a summary of the main events described in the two earlier volumes, and an account of Fry's later cocaine addiction, chiefly covering the years 1986–93. Other major topics include Fry's writing of The Hippopotamus, his work on the TV series A Bit of Fry & Laurie, Jeeves and Wooster and Blackadder Goes Forth; the radio series Saturday Night Fry; and the films Peter's Friends and Stalag Luft. The book is Fry's tenth, and his third volume of autobiography.

== Reception ==
Critical reception has been mixed but generally negative, citing Fry's reuse of material from earlier works, lack of emotional depth, and his depiction of heavy drug-taking.
