= The Not So Secret Life of the Manic Depressive: 10 Years On =

- Presented by: Stephen Fry

Original release
- Network: BBC
- Release: February 2016

The Not So Secret Life of the Manic Depressive: 10 Years On is a documentary by Stephen Fry. It was broadcast on the BBC in February 2016. It is a 10-year follow-up to The Secret Life of the Manic Depressive. In this documentary, Fry looked at how attitudes and awareness around mental health have changed in the intervening 10 years.
