= A Summer in the Cage =

- Directed by: Ben Selkow
- Written by: John Mims; Ben Selkow
- Produced by: Ben Selkow
- Cinematography: Ben Selkow
- Edited by: John Mims
- Music by: Hajo Carl
- Release date: October 22, 2007
- Running time: 82 minutes
- Country: United States
- Language: English

A Summer in the Cage is a 2007 documentary film about a man's experiences with bipolar disorder. The film follows the filmmaker's friend Sam and features an interview with mental health scholar Kay Redfield Jamison. It was directed by Benjamin Selkow. The documentary debuted on the Sundance Channel in 2007.

== Synopsis ==
A Summer in the Cage is filmmaker Ben Selkow's feature-length documentary chronicling his friend Sam's battle with manic-depressive illness. The film follows Sam for seven years as he suffers delusional manic episodes, battles paralyzing depressions, and tries to escape the legacy of his bipolar father who committed suicide when Sam was eight years old. By showing the difficult emotional impact of being bipolar on Sam, his family, and the filmmaker, A Summer in the Cage puts a human face on an illness that affects millions of American families. But as this dramatic story unfolds and finally reaches an explosive standoff, it also becomes a unique tale about friendship and the ethical responsibilities of a documentary filmmaker.

== See also ==
- Stephen Fry: The Secret Life of the Manic Depressive
