= The Ode Less Travelled =

2005 book by Stephen Fry

The Ode Less Travelled: Unlocking the Poet Within
- Author: Stephen Fry
- Language: English
- Subject: Poetry, prose
- Publisher: Hutchinson
- Publication date: November 21, 2005 (US)
- Pages: 220 pp (hardcover) 357 pp (paperback)
- ISBN: 0-091-79661-X (Hutchinson)
- OCLC: 62124135
- Dewey Decimal: 808.1 22
- LC Class: PN1059.A9 F79 2005
- Preceded by: Stephen Fry's Incomplete and Utter History of Classical Music
- Followed by: QI: The Book of General Ignorance

The Ode Less Travelled: Unlocking the Poet Within is a book by author, actor, comedian, and director Stephen Fry about writing poetry. Fry covers metre, rhyme, many common and arcane poetic forms, and offers poetry exercises, contrasting modern and classic poets. The title of the book is a play on The Road Less Travelled by M. Scott Peck.

Fry's starting point can be summed up by the quotation with which he heads Chapter One: 'Poetry is metrical writing./If it isn't that I don't know what it is.' (J. V. Cunningham.) In a 'rant' near the end of the book he states: "I think that much poetry today suffers from anaemia. There is no iron in its blood, no energy, no drive".

Fry sets out to explain the many tools available to a poet in order to organise writing, noting poetry's essential metrical basis and introducing the many technical terms, with explanations and exercises. The book offers twenty 'Poetry Exercises', with one or two in each chapter.

The first main section, 'Metre', has six chapters, introducing the natural rhythm of spoken English and many forms of metre. In fact, 28 are listed in the 'Table of Metric Feet' which concludes this major section of the book. The next section, 'Rhyme', has three chapters, explaining the 'basic categories', 'rhyming arrangements' and discussing what is good or bad rhyme. Eleven chapters follow on 'Form', starting with a chapter on 'The Stanza. What is Form and Why Bother with It?' Closed and open forms, heroic verse, forms of ode, ballads, comic verse, sonnets, shaped verse; these and several more are explained along with examples. The book's final section is entitled 'Diction and Poetics Today'. There is also a 600 (approx) word 'Incomplete Glossary of Poetic Terms'.

== Launch dates ==
- UK: October 20, 2005. Hutchinson.
- USA: November 22, 2005
- UK: 2007. Arrow Books, London. (Paperback) ISBN 978-0-099-50934-9
