= Mythos (book) =

2017 book by Stephen Fry

- First edition
- Author: Stephen Fry
- Publisher: Michael Joseph
- Publication date: 2017
- ISBN: 9780718188726

Mythos is a book written by British author Stephen Fry, published in 2017. It is a retelling of a number of ancient Greek myths selected by Fry. It was followed by Fry's 2018 book Heroes, a retelling of myths about Greek heroes, as well as a play titled Mythos: A Trilogy, which premiered at the Shaw Festival in Ontario, Canada, in 2018 and was set to tour the UK starting in August 2019. The third and fourth books, named Troy and Odyssey, followed in 2020 and 2024 respectively.

== Synopsis ==
Fry states at the beginning of the book that no background knowledge is necessary to appreciate the stories and that "there is absolutely nothing academic or intellectual about Greek mythology; it is addictive, entertaining, approachable and astonishingly human". The stories are mostly retellings of myths derived from Hesiod's Theogony, Ovid's Metamorphoses and Apuleius's The Golden Ass/Donkey.

== Reception ==
Mythos received a rating of 4/5 in a review titled "What kind of a book is Stephen Fry's Mythos? Who knows — but it's clever and fun" in the culture section of The Telegraph. The Scotsman praised the book's accessibility as well as Fry's knowledge and enthusiasm about the subject but criticised the inconsistency of the book's style, saying that it shifts between being erudite and "deliberately downmarket".

British scholar Edith Hall criticised Fry's limited selection of myths in her review for The Guardian and said that the book's lack of a contents page or index means that the reader is not warned of its uncomprehensive nature. She goes on however to commend Fry for putting his fame to constructive use and to say that his "distinctive voice undoubtedly adds something lively, humorous and intimate to myth's psychological dimension. People who enjoy his media personality and particular style of post‑Wodehouse English drollery are in for a treat".
