= Stephen Fry: Out There =

2013 television documentary

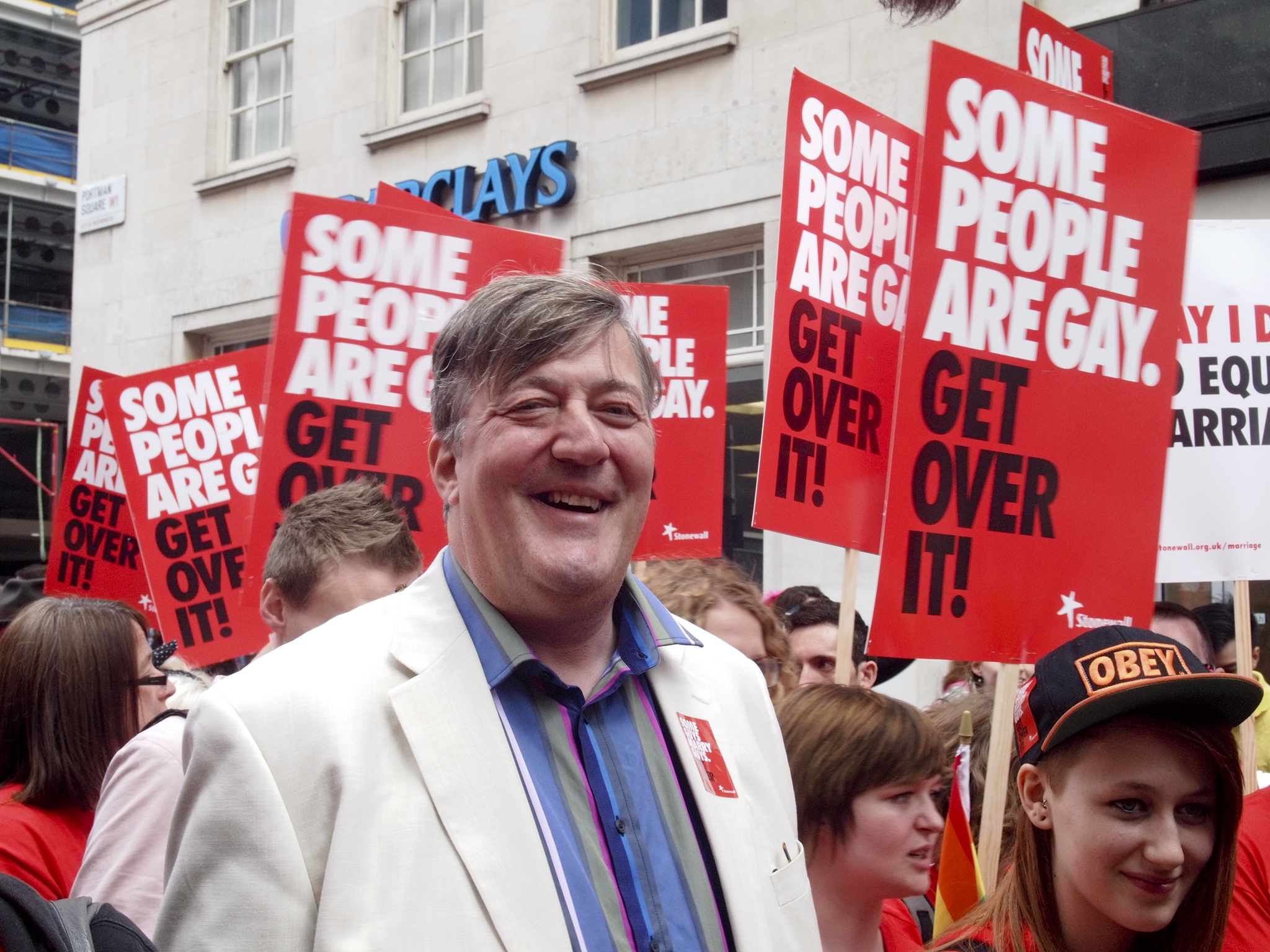
Stephen Fry (non-promotional picture)

Stephen Fry: Out There is a two-part 2013 television documentary in which Stephen Fry explores attitudes to homosexuality and the lives of gay people in different parts of the globe.

== Synopsis ==
=== Episode 1 ===
Stephen Fry meets Elton John and David Furnish, the couple who inspired Stephen to be open about his sexuality as well as many others. Stephen travels to Uganda, where the government was considering, and in January 2014 implemented, a new law that would make homosexuality a capital crime—putting gay people to death for their sexuality.

Stephen also travels to the US to explore gay 'reparative therapy,' (which is now more commonly known as conversion therapy) and talks to openly gay actors Neil Patrick Harris and David Ross, and gay reparative therapist Joseph Nicolosi. Nicolosi states that 60% of his clients are teenagers, and says "parents call up in a panic because they found out their son is looking at gay porn, and, of course we have to get him into therapy". After the segment, Fry states that "for all his talk of success, Nicolosi is unable to find one of his ex-gays to talk to us". Fry then speaks with Daniel Gonzales, a man who did not have success with reparative therapy. Gonzales denounces reparative therapy, and is described as an ex-ex-gay.

=== Episode 2 ===
Stephen visits Brazil where one gay person is murdered every 36 hours, and interviews then Federal Deputy for Rio de Janeiro. Brazilian anti-homosexuality politician, and future president of Brazil Jair Bolsonaro. Fry also visits Russia and speaks with politician and legislature Vitaly Milonov. Episode 2 also covers the ostracism of hijras in India.
