= Stephen Fry =

English actor and comedian (born 1957)

Sir Stephen Fry FRSL FRSA
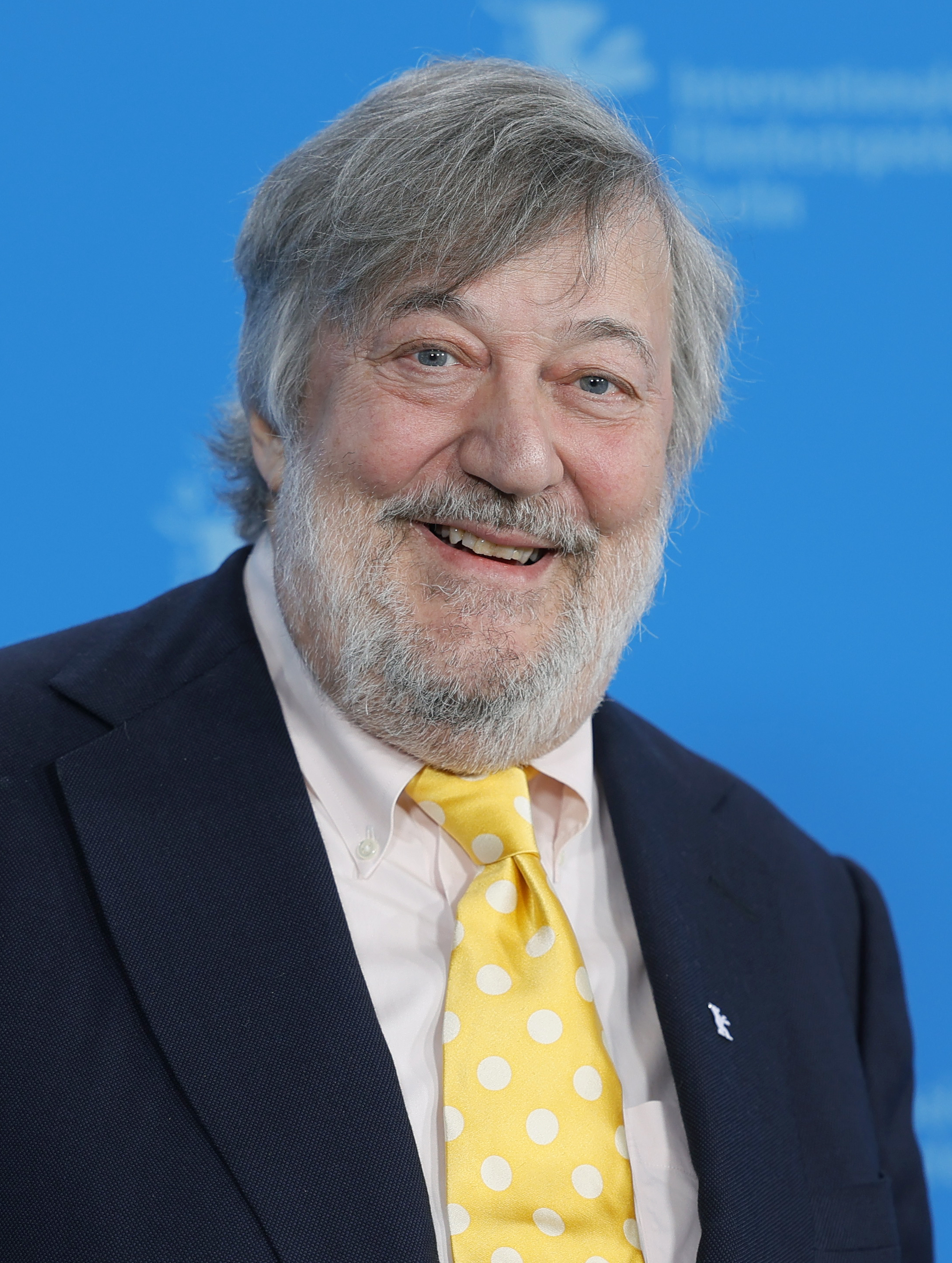
- Fry in 2024
- Born: Stephen John Fry; 24 August 1957 (age 69); Hampstead, London, England
- Citizenship: United Kingdom; Austria (since 2024)
- Education: University of Cambridge (MA)
- Occupations: Actor; broadcaster; comedian; writer
- Years active: 1980–present
- Works: Full list
- Spouse: Elliott Spencer (m. 2015)
- Awards: Full list
- Stephen Fry's voice Recorded January 2014
- Website: stephenfry.com

Sir Stephen John Fry (born 24 August 1957) is an English actor, comedian, writer, and broadcaster. He began his career on the sketch comedy series Alfresco (1983–1984) and the sitcom Blackadder (1986–1989), before gaining recognition as part of the comedy duo Fry and Laurie alongside Hugh Laurie, appearing together in A Bit of Fry & Laurie (1989–1995) and Jeeves and Wooster (1990–1993). His later television roles include Kingdom (2007–2009), Bones (2007–2017), and The Dropout (2021). Fry was the original host of the comedy panel show QI (2003–2016), for which he was nominated for six BAFTA TV Awards. In 2025, Fry was knighted for services to mental health awareness, the environment, and charity.

Fry's film credits include Chariots of Fire (1981), A Fish Called Wanda (1988), Gosford Park (2001), The Life and Death of Peter Sellers (2004), V for Vendetta (2005), Sherlock Holmes: A Game of Shadows (2011), and Love & Friendship (2016). He portrayed the Cheshire Cat in Alice in Wonderland (2010) and its 2016 sequel, and the Master of Lake-town in the film trilogy adaptation of The Hobbit (2013–2014). For playing Oscar Wilde in the film Wilde (1997) he was nominated for the Golden Globe Award for Best Actor. Between 2001 and 2017, he hosted the BAFTA Film Awards 12 times.

Fry is known for his work in theatre. He adapted Me and My Girl (1983) where it ran for eight years on the West End before transferring to Broadway where he received a Tony Award for Best Book of a Musical nomination. In 2012, Fry played Malvolio in Twelfth Night at Shakespeare's Globe. The production was then taken to the West End, before transferring to Broadway, where he received a nomination for a Tony Award for Best Featured Actor in a Play. Fry played Lady Bracknell in the National Theatre production of Oscar Wilde's The Importance of Being Earnest (2025–2026).

Fry has written and presented several documentary series, including the Emmy Award–winning Stephen Fry: The Secret Life of the Manic Depressive (2006) and the travel series Stephen Fry in America (2008). He is also a prolific writer, contributing to newspapers and magazines, and has written four novels and three autobiographies. He has lent his voice to numerous projects, including the audiobooks for all seven of the Harry Potter novels as well as the Paddington Bear books. Since 2011, Fry has served as president of the mental health charity Mind. In 2006, the British public ranked Fry number 9 in ITV's poll of TV's 50 Greatest Stars.

== Early life and education ==
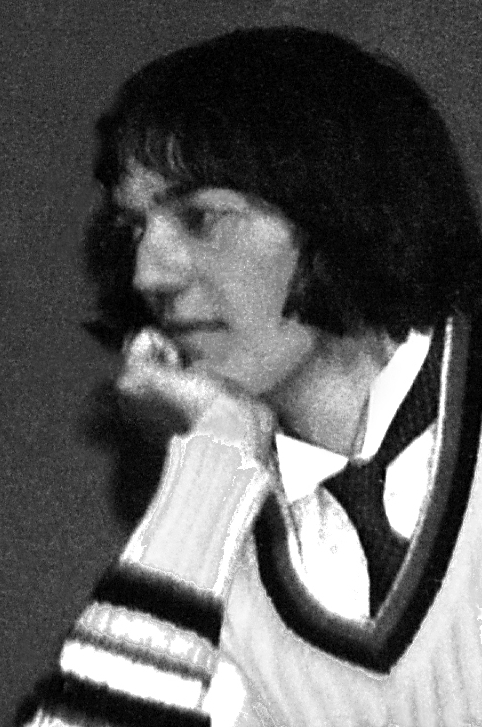
Fry at rehearsals for a student production of A Midsummer Night's Dream at Norfolk College of Arts and Technology, 1975

Stephen John Fry was born on 24 August 1957 in the Hampstead area of London, the son of historian Marianne Eve Fry (née Neumann) and physicist and inventor Alan John Fry (1930–2019). He has an older brother, Roger, and a younger sister, Joanna. His paternal grandmother, Ella Fry (née Pring), had roots in Cheshire and Kent. The Fry family originates around the Shillingstone and Blandford areas of Dorset; in the early 1800s, Samuel Fry settled in Surrey, with his descendants residing in Middlesex. In his autobiographical writings and elsewhere, Fry has claimed a relationship to the Fry family that founded the J. S. Fry & Sons chocolate company, John Fry (one of the signatories to the death warrant for Charles I), and the cricketer C. B. Fry. Fry's mother is Jewish, but he was not brought up in a religious family. His maternal grandparents, Martin and Rosa Neumann, were Hungarian Jews who emigrated from Šurany (now in Slovakia) to the UK in 1927, establishing themselves in Bury St. Edmunds. Rosa's parents, who originally lived in Vienna, were deported to a Nazi ghetto in Riga, where they were killed. His mother's aunt and cousins were sent to Auschwitz and Stutthof and never seen again.

Fry grew up in the village of Booton, Norfolk, having moved at an early age from Chesham, Buckinghamshire, where he had attended Chesham Preparatory School. He briefly attended Cawston Primary School in Cawston, Norfolk, before going on to Stouts Hill Preparatory School in Uley, Gloucestershire, at the age of seven, and then to Uppingham School in Rutland, where he joined Fircroft house and was described as a "near-asthmatic genius". He took his O-levels in 1972 at the early age of 14 and passed all except physics, but was expelled from Uppingham half a term into the sixth form. Fry described himself as a "monstrous" child and wrote that he was expelled for "various misdemeanours". He has also said the school permitted him to travel to London, to present a paper to the Sherlock Holmes Society of London, about parallels he had discovered between Macavity, one of T.S.Eliot's Practical Cats, and Professor Moriarty, the villain in the Sherlock Holmes stories (though he has since realised 'it was hardly news', and he had discovered no great literary secret). He then stayed in London watching films, and returned three days later than expected, by which time the police were searching for him.

He was also dismissed from Paston School, a grant-maintained grammar school that refused to let him progress to study A-Levels, and he then moved to Norfolk College of Arts and Technology, where, after two years in the sixth form studying English, French, and History of Art, he ultimately failed his A-Levels, not turning up for his English and French papers. Over the summer, Fry absconded with a credit card stolen from a family friend. He had taken a coat when leaving a pub, planning to spend the night sleeping rough, but had then discovered the card in a pocket. and used it fraudulently on a "spending spree". He was arrested in Swindon and, as a result, spent three months in Pucklechurch Remand Centre on remand. Following his release, he resumed his education at City College Norwich, promising administrators that he would study rigorously and sit the University of Cambridge entrance exams. In 1977, he passed two A-levels in English and French, with grades of A and B. He also received a grade A in an alternative O-level in the Study of Art and scored a distinction in an S-level paper in English. Having successfully passed the entrance exams in 1977, Fry was offered a scholarship at Queens' College, Cambridge, for matriculation in 1978, briefly teaching at Cundall Manor School, a preparatory school in North Yorkshire, before taking his place. At Cambridge, he joined the Footlights, appeared on the University Challenge TV quiz, and read English Literature, graduating with an upper second-class honours BA degree in 1981 (subsequently promoted automatically to a Cambridge MA degree). Fry also met his future comedy collaborator, Hugh Laurie (through their mutual friend Emma Thompson) at Cambridge and starred alongside him in the Footlights.

== Career ==
=== 1981–1993: Sketch comedy beginnings ===
Fry wrote the play Latin! or Tobacco and Boys for the 1980 Edinburgh Festival, where it won the Fringe First prize. It had a revival in 2009 at London's Cock Tavern Theatre, directed by Adam Spreadbury-Maher. The Cellar Tapes, the Footlights Revue of 1981, won the Perrier Comedy Award. In 1984, Fry adapted the hugely successful 1930s musical Me and My Girl for the West End, where it ran for eight years and received two Laurence Olivier Awards. The show transferred to Broadway, and Fry was nominated for a Tony Award for his adaptation.

Fry has appeared in numerous advertisements, predominantly on UK television – either on-screen or in voice-over – starting with an appearance as "Count Ivan Skavinsky Skavar" in a 1982 advert for Whitbread Best Bitter. Fry has said, in his memoirs, that after receiving his payment for this work – £25,000 – he has never subsequently experienced "what one could call serious money troubles". He has since appeared in adverts for products and companies such as Marks & Spencer, Twinings, Kenco, Vauxhall Motors, Honda, Calpol, Heineken, Alliance & Leicester (a series of adverts which also featured Hugh Laurie), After Eight mints, Direct Line insurance (with Paul Merton), Trebor mints, Virgin Media, Walkers potato crisps (fronting a new flavour), and Sainsbury's supermarket. He filmed a 2016 advertisement where he explains the essence of British culture to foreigners arriving at London's Heathrow Airport.

Fry's career in television began with the 1982 broadcasting of The Cellar Tapes, the 1981 Cambridge Footlights Revue which was written by Fry, Hugh Laurie, Emma Thompson, and Tony Slattery. The revue caught the attention of Granada Television, which, keen to replicate the success of the BBC's Not the Nine O'Clock News, hired Fry, Laurie, and Thompson to star alongside Ben Elton in There's Nothing to Worry About! A second series, retitled Alfresco, was broadcast in 1983, and a third in 1984; it established Fry and Laurie's reputation as a comedy double act. In 1983, the BBC offered Fry, Laurie, and Thompson their own show, which became The Crystal Cube, a mixture of science fiction and mockumentary that was cancelled after the first episode. Undeterred, Fry, Laurie, and Thompson appeared in "Bambi", an episode of The Young Ones from 1984 where they parodied themselves as the University Challenge representatives of "Footlights College, Oxbridge", and Fry also appeared in Ben Elton's 1985 Happy Families series. In April 1986, Fry was among the British comedians who appeared in the first live telethon Comic Relief. In 1986 and 1987, Fry and Laurie performed sketches on the LWT/Channel 4 show Saturday Live.

In 1986, the BBC commissioned a sketch show that was to become A Bit of Fry & Laurie. Following a 1987 pilot, the programme ran for 26 episodes across four series between 1989 and 1995. During this time, Fry starred in Blackadder II as Lord Melchett, made a guest appearance in Blackadder the Third as the Duke of Wellington, and then returned to a starring role in Blackadder Goes Forth as General Melchett. In a 1988 television special, Blackadder's Christmas Carol, he played the roles of Lord Melchett and Lord Frondo. Between 1990 and 1993, Fry starred as Jeeves (alongside Hugh Laurie's Bertie Wooster) in Jeeves and Wooster, 23 hour-long adaptations of P. G. Wodehouse's novels and short stories. Fry has appeared in several BBC adaptations of plays and books, including a 1992 adaptation of the Simon Gray play The Common Pursuit (he had previously appeared in the West End stage production).

Having made his film début in The Good Father (1985), followed by a brief cameo in A Fish Called Wanda (1988; getting clobbered by Kevin Kline in an airport), Fry was then featured by Kenneth Branagh as the eponymous Peter in Peter's Friends (1992). Fry came to the attention of radio listeners with the 1986 creation of his alter-ego, Donald Trefusis, whose "wireless essays" were broadcast on the BBC Radio 4 programme Loose Ends. In the 1980s, he starred as David Lander in four series of the BBC Radio 4 show Delve Special, written by Tony Sarchet, which then became the six-part Channel 4 series This is David Lander in 1988. In 1988, Fry wrote and presented a six-part comedy series entitled Saturday Night Fry. Frequent radio appearances have ensued, notably on panel games Just a Minute and I'm Sorry I Haven't a Clue.

Fry was cast in Simon Gray's The Common Pursuit for its first staging in the West End on 7 April 1988, with Rik Mayall, John Sessions, Sarah Berger, Paul Mooney, and John Gordon Sinclair, directed by Simon Gray. Fry is a long-standing fan of the anarchic British musical comedy group the Bonzo Dog Doo-Dah Band, and particularly of its eccentric front man, the late Vivian Stanshall. Fry helped to fund a 1988 London re-staging of Stanshall's Stinkfoot, a Comic Opera, written by Vivian and Ki Longfellow-Stanshall for the Bristol-based Old Profanity Showboat.

=== 1994–2008: Film roles, voice work, and QI ===
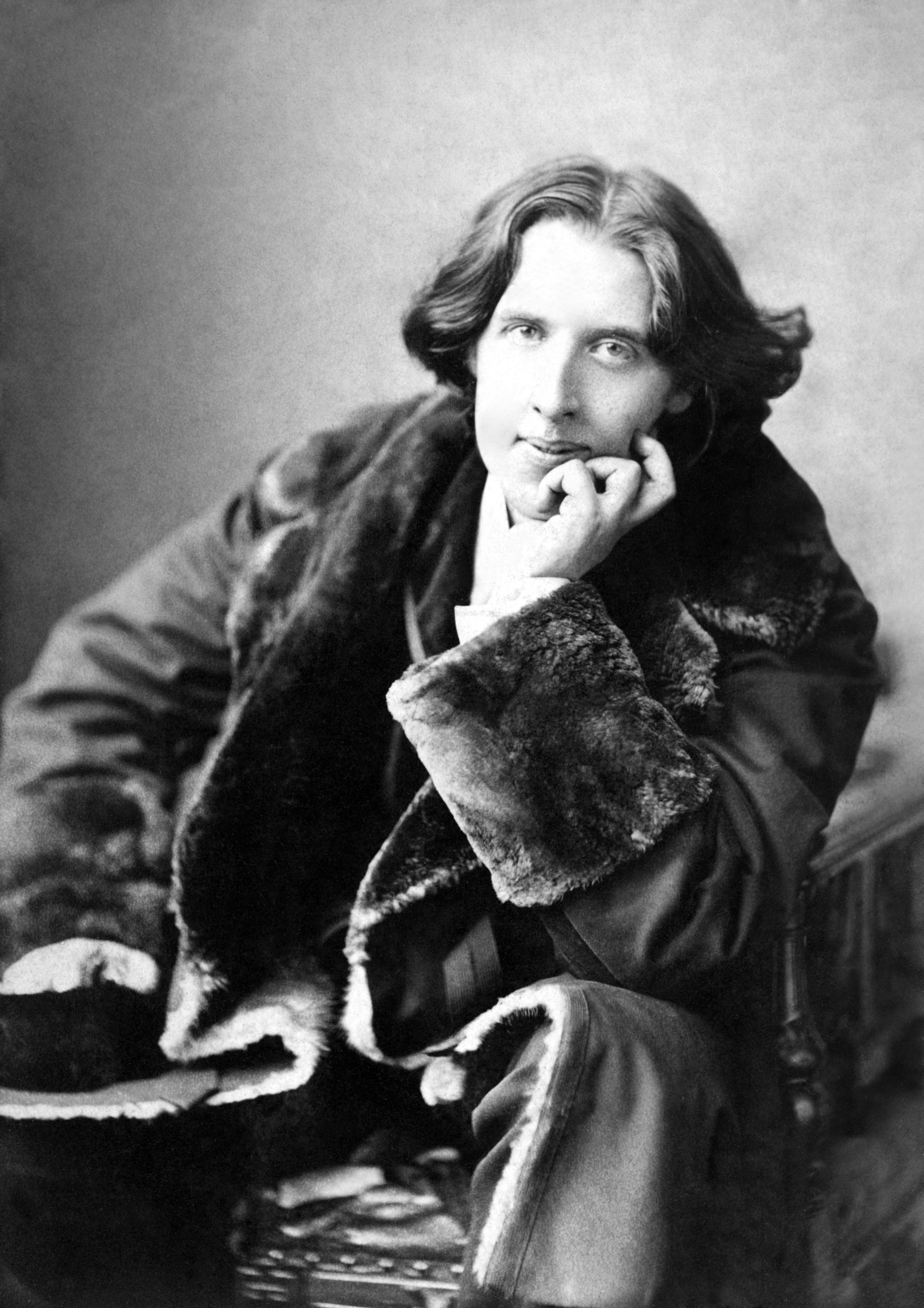
Fry called Oscar Wilde (pictured) in the 1997 film Wilde, a role he was "born to play".

Fry's first novel, The Liar, was published in 1991. Fry has since written three further novels, several non-fiction works, and three volumes of autobiography. Making History (1996) is partly set in an alternative universe in which Adolf Hitler's father is made infertile, and his replacement proves a more effective Führer. The book won the Sidewise Award for Alternate History. The Hippopotamus (1994) is about Edward (Ted/Tedward) Wallace and his stay at his old friend Lord Logan's country manor in Norfolk. The Hippopotamus was later adapted into a 2017 film. The Stars' Tennis Balls (2000) is a modern retelling of The Count of Monte Cristo. Fry's book The Ode Less Travelled: Unlocking the Poet Within is a guide to writing poetry.

When writing a book review for Tatler, Fry wrote under a pen name, Williver Hendry, editor of A Most Peculiar Friendship: The Correspondence of Lord Alfred Douglas and Jack Dempsey, a field close to his heart as an Oscar Wilde enthusiast. Once a columnist in The Listener and The Daily Telegraph, he wrote a weekly technology column in the Saturday edition of The Guardian. His blog attracted more than 300,000 visitors in its first two weeks.

Fry was cast in a lead role in Simon Gray's 1995 play Cell Mates, which he left three days into the West End run, pleading stage fright. He later recalled the incident as a hypomanic episode in his documentary about bipolar disorder, The Secret Life of the Manic Depressive. He acted in a 1998 Malcolm Bradbury adaptation of the Mark Tavener novel In the Red, taking the part of the Controller of BBC Radio 2; and in 2000, in the role of Professor Bellgrove in the BBC serial Gormenghast, which was adapted from the first two novels of Mervyn Peake's Gormenghast series. In the 1994 romantic comedy film I.Q., he played the role of James Moreland. Portraying his idol Oscar Wilde (of whom he had been an ardent admirer since the age of 13) in the 1997 film Wilde, he fulfilled the role to critical acclaim. It earned him a Golden Globe nomination for Best Actor – Drama. In 1997, he also had a cameo in the Spice Girls film Spice World. A year later, Fry starred in David Yates' small independent film The Tichborne Claimant, and in 2001, he played the detective in Robert Altman's period costume drama, Gosford Park. In the same year, he also appeared in the Dutch film The Discovery of Heaven, directed by Jeroen Krabbé and based on the novel by Harry Mulisch.

In 2000, Fry began starring as Charles Prentiss in the Radio 4 comedy Absolute Power, reprising the role for three further series on radio, and two on television. In 2002, he played The Minister of Chance in the Doctor Who audio drama Death Comes to Time. In 2002, Fry was one of the narrators of A. A. Milne's Winnie-the-Pooh and The House at Pooh Corner, in which he voiced Winnie-the-Pooh. He presented a 20-part, two-hour series, The Incomplete and Utter History of Classical Music, a "witty guide" to the genre over the past 1,000 years, on Classic FM. In 2004, he was the narrator for an adaptation of Vanity Fair on BBC Radio 4. Fry has been the reader for the British versions of all of J. K. Rowling's Harry Potter series of audiobooks. He discussed this project in an interview with Rowling in 2005. He has also read for Douglas Adams' The Hitchhiker's Guide to the Galaxy film tie-in edition and has made recordings of his own books, such as The Stars' Tennis Balls and Moab Is My Washpot, and of works by Roald Dahl, Michael Bond, A. A. Milne, Anthony Buckeridge, Eleanor Updale, George Orwell, and Alexander Pushkin.

In 2003, Fry began hosting QI (Quite Interesting), a comedy panel game television quiz show. QI was created and co-produced by John Lloyd, and features permanent panellist Alan Davies. QI has the highest viewing figures for any show on BBC Four and Dave (formerly UKTV G2). In 2006, Fry won the Rose d'Or award for "Best Game Show Host" for his work on the series. In October 2015, it was announced that Fry would retire as the host of QI after the "M" series, and he was replaced by Sandi Toksvig.

Towards the end of 2003, Fry starred alongside John Bird in the television adaptation of Absolute Power, previously a radio series on BBC Radio 4. Fry's first documentary was the Emmy Award-winning Stephen Fry: The Secret Life of the Manic Depressive in 2006. The same year, he appeared on the BBC's genealogy series Who Do You Think You Are?, tracing his maternal family tree to investigate his Jewish ancestry. In 2003, Fry made his directorial début with Bright Young Things, adapted by him from Evelyn Waugh's Vile Bodies. In 2001, he began hosting the BAFTA Film Awards, a role from which he stepped down in 2006. Later that same year, he wrote the English libretto and dialogue for Kenneth Branagh's film adaptation of The Magic Flute. Fry continued to make regular film appearances, notably in treatments of literary cult classics. He portrayed the clairvoyant Maurice Woodruff in The Life and Death of Peter Sellers and served as narrator in the 2005 film version of The Hitchhiker's Guide to the Galaxy. In 2005, he appeared in A Cock and Bull Story, based on Tristram Shandy. In the same year, in V for Vendetta, he played a closeted TV presenter who challenges a fascist state. The screenwriters, The Wachowskis, pointed out that it was Fry's "normalcy" in the face of state censorship gave the character its power and added a "wholly unexpected dimension to the film". Fry performed several of Stanshall's numbers as part of the Bonzos' 2006 reunion concert at the London Astoria.

In 2006, he played the role of gadget-master Smithers in Stormbreaker, and in 2007, he appeared as himself, hosting a quiz in St Trinian's. In 2007, Fry wrote, for director Peter Jackson, a script for a remake of The Dam Busters. That year, he also appeared in Eichmann (2007). Fry narrated The Story of Light Entertainment, which was shown from July–September 2006. In 2007, he presented a documentary on the subject of HIV and AIDS, HIV and Me. In 2007, Fry wrote a Christmas pantomime, Cinderella, which ran at London's Old Vic Theatre. In 2007, he hosted Current Puns, an exploration of wordplay, and Radio 4: This Is Your Life, to celebrate the radio station's 40th anniversary. He also interviewed Prime Minister Tony Blair as part of a series of podcasts released by 10 Downing Street. He also narrated the first four Harry Potter games: Philosopher's Stone, Chamber of Secrets, Prisoner of Azkaban, and Goblet of Fire.

From 2007 to 2009, Fry played the lead role in (and was executive producer for) the legal drama Kingdom, which ran for three series on ITV1. Starting from 2007, he took a recurring guest role as FBI psychiatrist Dr. (later chef) Gordon Wyatt in the popular American drama Bones.

=== 2009–2014: Return to theatre and documentaries ===
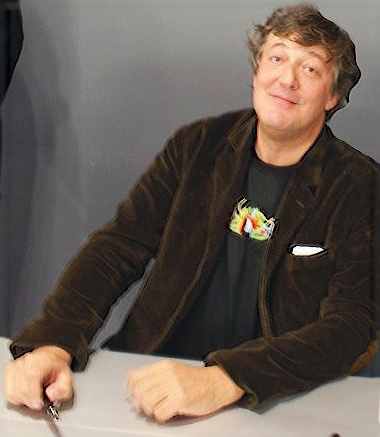
Fry signing autographs at the Apple Store, Regent Street, London in 2009

In February 2008, Fry began presenting podcasts entitled Stephen Fry's Podgrams, in which he recounts his life and recent experiences. In July 2008, he appeared as himself in I Love Stephen Fry, an Afternoon Play for Radio 4 written by former Fry and Laurie script editor Jon Canter. On 7 May 2008, Fry gave a speech as part of a series of BBC lectures on the future of public service broadcasting in the United Kingdom, which he later recorded for a podcast. His six-part travel series Stephen Fry in America began on BBC One in October 2008 and saw him travel to each of the 50 US states. In the same year, he narrated the nature documentary Spectacled Bears: Shadow of the Forest for the BBC Natural World series. In the 2009 television series Last Chance to See, Fry and zoologist Mark Carwardine sought out endangered species, some of which had been featured in Douglas Adams' and Carwardine's 1990 book and radio series of the same name.

Fry's voice has been featured in several video games, including an appearance as Reaver, an amoral supporting character in Lionhead Studios' games Fable II (2008) and Fable III (2010), and as the narrator of the LittleBigPlanet series. He also narrates a section of Bungie's Destiny 2 (2017) expansion Warmind as the "Concierge", an AI that, when interacted with at certain points, will give the player background information on Bray Exoscience. In 2008, Fry's narration for Bond's Paddington Bear story More About Paddington (1959) saw him receive the Audie Award for Young Listeners' Title from the Audio Publishers Association in the U.S.

Since August 2008, he has presented Fry's English Delight, a series on BBC Radio 4 about the English language. As of 2021, it has been running for ten series and 37 episodes. In the 2009 series of I'm Sorry I Haven't a Clue, Fry was one of a trio of hosts replacing Humphrey Lyttelton (the others being Jack Dee and Rob Brydon). Fry was offered a role in Valkyrie, but was unable to participate. In May 2009, Fry unveiled The Dongle of Donald Trefusis, an audiobook series following Donald Trefusis (a fictional character from Fry's novel The Liar and from the BBC Radio 4 series Loose Ends), set over 12 episodes. After its release, it reached No. 1 on the UK Album Chart list. Ultimately, however, only three episodes were released, the rest with the note 'exact release date pending'. Fry's use of the word "luvvie" (spelled "lovie" by Fry), in The Guardian on 2 April 1988, is given by the Oxford English Dictionary as the earliest recorded use of the word as a humorous synonym for "actor". Fry was, at one time, slated to adapt A Confederacy of Dunces by John Kennedy Toole for the big screen. In 2009, Fry provided the voice of St Peter for Liberace, Live From Heaven by Julian Woolford at London's Leicester Square Theatre. In 2010, having learned some Irish for the role, he filmed a cameo role in Ros na Rún, an Irish-language soap opera broadcast in Ireland, Scotland, and the US.

In 2010, Fry became an investor in Pushnote, a UK tech startup. Similar to Google Sidewiki, Pushnote was a browser add-on that enabled users to leave comments on any site they visit. The following year, Fry announced the Pushnote launch to his then 2 million Twitter followers. Both Pushnote and Sidewiki were discontinued the following year. He also appeared as a shiny New Millennium Bonzo on their post-reunion album, Pour l'Amour des Chiens, on which he recited a recipe for "Salmon Proust", played a butler in "Hawkeye the Gnu", and voiced ads for the fictitious "Fiasco" stores. Following three one-man shows in Australia, Fry announced a 'sort of stand-up' performance at the Royal Albert Hall in London for September 2010. In 2010, Fry took part in a Christmas series of short films called Little Crackers. His short was based on a story from his childhood at school.

Fry appeared as the Christian God in 2011's Holy Flying Circus. In 2011, he portrayed Professor Mildeye in the BBC adaptation of Mary Norton's 1952 novel The Borrowers. In August 2011, Stephen Fry's 100 Greatest Gadgets was shown on Channel 4 as one of the 100 Greatest strand. His choice for the greatest gadget was the cigarette lighter, which he described as "fire with a flick of the fingers". In the same month, the nature documentary series Ocean Giants, narrated by Fry, premiered. In September 2011, Fry's Planet Word, a five-part documentary about language, aired on BBC HD and BBC Two. In November 2011, an episode of Living The Life featured Fry in an intimate conversation discussing his life and career with The Rolling Stones' bass player Bill Wyman.

Fry starred in the Tim Burton version of Alice in Wonderland, as the voice of the Cheshire Cat. He played Mycroft Holmes in the 2011 film Sherlock Holmes: A Game of Shadows, directed by Guy Ritchie. He portrayed the Master of Lake-town in two of Peter Jackson's three film adaptation of J. R. R. Tolkien's The Hobbit: the second The Hobbit: The Desolation of Smaug, and the third The Hobbit: The Battle of the Five Armies. In 2011, Fry appeared on Kate Bush's album 50 Words for Snow, featuring on the title track where he recites a list of surreal words to describe snow. In September 2012, Fry made a return to the stage at Shakespeare's Globe, appearing as Malvolio in a production of William Shakespeare's Twelfth Night, which transferred to the West End in November 2012. He received excellent reviews. The production transferred to Broadway, with Opening Night on 10 November 2013. Fry was nominated for the Tony Award for Best Featured Actor in a Play for his work in the Broadway revival. In August 2013, he lent his voice to the title role in Benjamin Britten's operetta Paul Bunyan at the Wales Millennium Centre with the Welsh National Youth Opera.

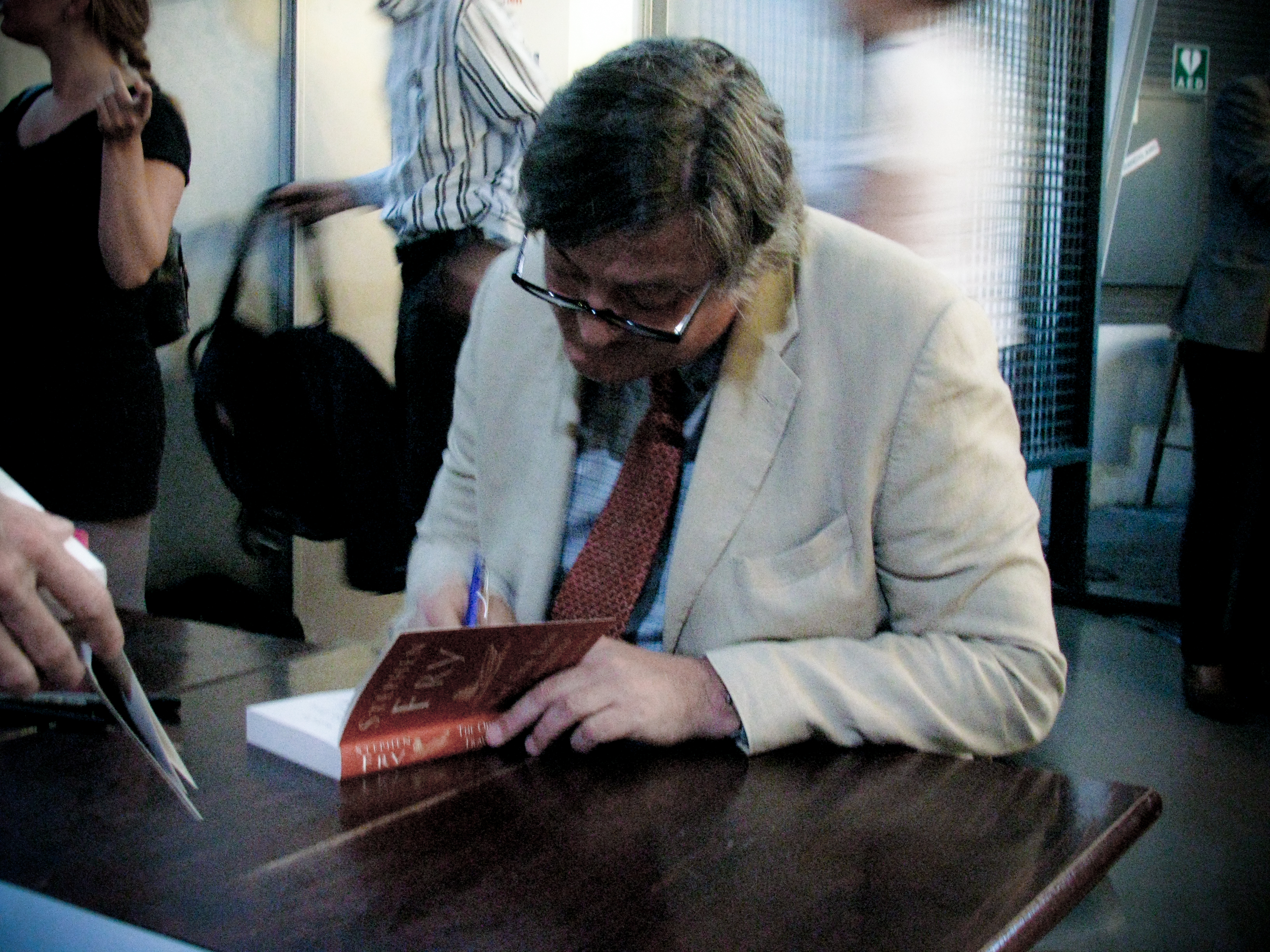
Fry signing one of his books in the Netherlands in 2011

In 2012, he appeared as a guest panellist in the BBC Radio 4 comedy panel show Wordaholics. In September 2012, he guest-starred as himself in the audio comedy drama We Are The BBC, produced by the Wireless Theatre Company, written by Susan Casanove. At the 2012 Pride of Britain Awards shown on ITV on 30 October, Fry, along with Michael Caine, Elton John, Richard Branson, and Simon Cowell, recited Rudyard Kipling's poem "If—" in tribute to the 2012 British Olympic and Paralympic athletes. In November 2012, Fry hosted a gadgets show called Gadget Man, exploring the usefulness of various gadgets in different daily situations to improve the livelihoods of everyone.

In October 2013, Fry presented Stephen Fry: Out There, a two-part documentary in which he explores attitudes to homosexuality and the lives of gay people in different parts of the globe. On Christmas Day 2013, Fry featured with adventurer Bear Grylls in an episode of Channel 4's Bear's Wild Weekends. Over the course of two days, in the Italian Dolomites, Fry travelled on the skids of a helicopter, climbed down a raging 500-foot waterfall, slept in a First World War trench, and abseiled down a towering cliff face. In June 2015, Fry was the guest on BBC Radio 4's Desert Island Discs. His favourite piece was Beethoven's String Quartet No. 14. His book choice was T. S. Eliot's Four Quartets, and his luxury item was "canvases, easels, brushes, an instruction manual". In 2013, he hosted an Intelligence Squared debate "Verdi vs. Wagner" at Royal Opera House for the composers' bicentenary. Fry narrated the first two seasons of the English-language version of the Spanish children's animated series Pocoyo. In 2014, he began starring alongside Kiefer Sutherland and William Devane in 24: Live Another Day as British Prime Minister Alastair Davies. In July 2014, Fry appeared on stage with Monty Python on the opening night of their live show Monty Python Live (Mostly). Fry was the special guest in their "Blackmail" sketch.

=== 2015–present ===
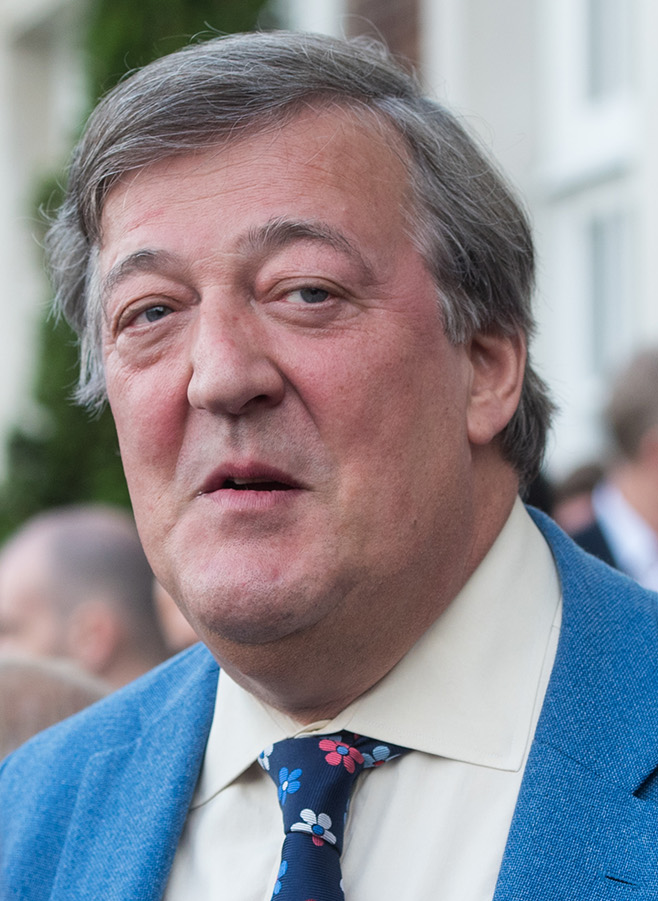
Fry in 2016

On 17 September 2015, Fry shared the role of the Narrator in The Rocky Horror Show, which was staged at London's Playhouse Theatre and broadcast as the Rocky Horror Show Live. In June 2015, Fry backed children's fairy tale app GivingTales in aid of UNICEF together with other British celebrities Sir Roger Moore, Ewan McGregor, Joanna Lumley, Michael Caine, David Walliams, Dame Joan Collins, Charlotte Rampling, Paul McKenna, and Michael Ball. In 2015, Fry made a live audio recording of the winning short story of the annual RA & Pin Drop Short Story Award, Ms. Featherstone and the Beast by Bethan Roberts, at a ceremony held at the Royal Academy of Arts in London. In February 2017, Audible released Sherlock Holmes: The Definitive Collection, a complete collection of Sherlock Holmes stories, all read by Fry, who also narrated an introduction for each novel or collection of stories. In 2017, Fry also released his own audiobook on Audible, titled Mythos, which he both wrote and narrated. In 2018, Fry released a follow-up to Mythos, titled Heroes. In June 2020, it was announced that Fry would read J. K. Rowling's children's book, The Ickabog. Fry is the patron of the audiobook charity Listening Books. Fry said of his patronage, "I'm proud and delighted to be patron of the first audiobook charity to offer downloads to its members and excited about what this will mean for all print-impaired people who can now listen on the go."

In January 2016, it was announced that Fry would be appearing as the character "Cuddly Dick" in Series 3 of the Sky One family comedy Yonderland. In 2016, Fry had a lead role in the American sitcom The Great Indoors. He portrayed an outdoor magazine publisher helping to ease his best worldly reporter (Joel McHale) into a desk job. The show was cancelled after one season. In November 2019, it was announced that Fry would guest star in "Spyfall", the two-part opening episode of Doctor Who's twelfth series, which was broadcast on New Year's Day 2020. Fry also starred in the 2018 heist comedy film The Con Is On, previously titled The Brits Are Coming. From May to July 2018, Fry appeared in Mythos: A Trilogy, a stage version of his book Mythos, in the Shaw Festival Theatre in Niagara-on-the-Lake, Ontario. This comprised a set of three one-man shows (titled Gods, Heroes and Men), each two hours in length, which were performed consecutively, multiple times during the show's run. The production received its European premiere in August 2019 at the Edinburgh International Festival. In September 2020, Fry was among the stars to mark the 100th anniversary of Sir Noël Coward's West End debut with a stage celebration titled "A Marvellous Party".

He reprised his role as (a descendant of) Lord Melchett for The Big Night In, a 20 April 2020 telethon held during the COVID-19 pandemic, for a skit in which he held a video call with Prince William, Duke of Cambridge, who made a surprise appearance. In 2022, Fry had a recurring role as biochemist Ian Gibbons in the Hulu miniseries The Dropout, which dramatizes the scandal involving biotechnology company Theranos. He portrayed Fiddler's Green / Gilbert in the Netflix series The Sandman (2022). The same year, he starred in two episodes of the Netflix romantic LGBT teen drama Heartstopper as the headmaster of the main character's school. In 2023, he portrayed a fictitious King James III in the LGBT romantic comedy Red, White & Royal Blue. That same year, he also presented the Channel 4 documentary Stephen Fry: Willem & Frieda – Defying the Nazis to positive reviews.

In 2021, Stephen Fry was the regular voiceover for Sainsbury’s Adverts.

In May 2024, Fry was among the members of the previously all-male Garrick Club who spoke in favour of the admission of women members for the first time in the club's 193-year history. The motion was carried.

Fry has been appointed visiting professor of Creative Media at the Faculty of English of the University of Oxford for the 2024–2025 academic year.

Fry also voiced the BFG In a Sainsbury’s Christmas Advert between 2024, 2025, and 2026.

In May 2025, Fry was announced as a contestant on the first series of The Celebrity Traitors. He joined the game as a 'Faithful' and was banished in Episode 6. From September 2025 until January 2026, Fry appeared as Lady Bracknell in the National Theatre production of The Importance of Being Earnest by Oscar Wilde. On February 2026, it is reported that Fry created, wrote, executive produced, and is starring as the lead character Conrad Henry, an ex-MI6 interrogator, of the upcoming Fox show The Interrogator.

== Awards, honours, and recognition ==
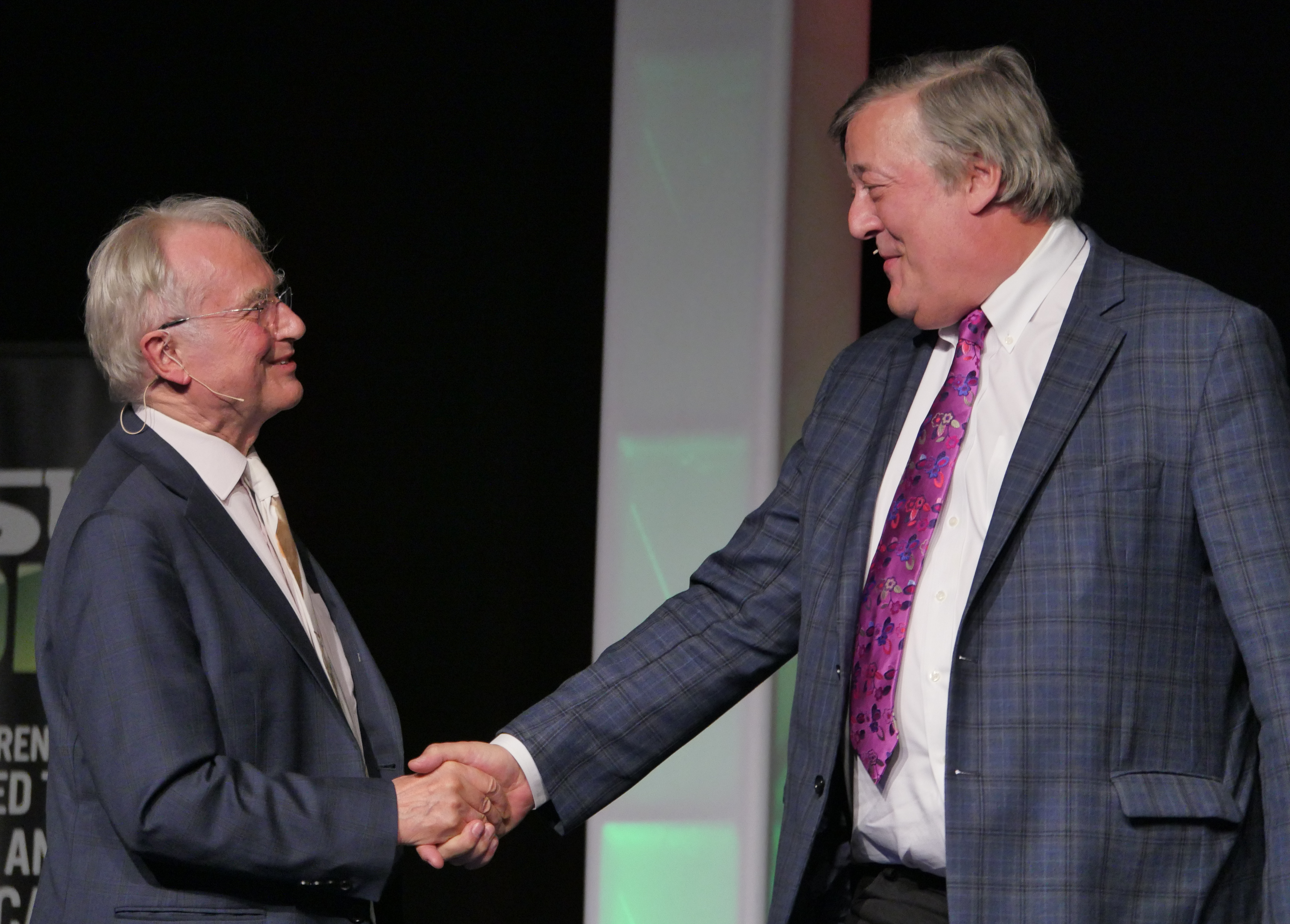
Richard Dawkins and Fry in 2018

Over Fry's career, he has received 11 BAFTA Award nominations for his work in television. For his performance as Oscar Wilde in Wilde (1998), he earned a nomination for the Golden Globe Award for Best Actor – Motion Picture Drama. He won the Screen Actors Guild Award for Outstanding Performance by a Cast in a Motion Picture along with the ensemble of the Robert Altman-directed murder mystery Gosford Park (2001). For his work on Broadway, he received two Tony Award nominations for Best Book of a Musical for Me and My Girl (1987) and Best Featured Actor in a Play for his performance as Malvolio in the revival of William Shakespeare's Twelfth Night (2014).

In 1995, Fry was awarded the honorary degree of Doctor of Laws (LL.D. h.c.) by the University of Dundee, which named their main Students' Association bar after his novel The Liar. Fry is a patron of its Lip Theatre Company. He also served two consecutive terms – 1992 to 1995 and 1995 to 1998 – as the student-elected Rector of the University of Dundee. He was awarded an Honorary Doctorate in Letters (D.Litt. h.c.) by the University of East Anglia in 1999.

In 2003, Fry was the last person to be named Pipe Smoker of the Year before the award was discontinued. He was awarded the AoC Gold Award in 2004 and was entered into their Hall of Fame. Fry was also awarded the honorary degree of Doctor of the University (DUniv) from Anglia Ruskin University in 2005.

In December 2006, he was ranked sixth for the BBC's Top Living Icon Award, was featured on The Culture Show, and was voted Most Intelligent Man on Television by readers of Radio Times. The Independent on Sunday Pink List named Fry the second most influential gay person in Britain in May 2007; he had taken the twenty-third position on the list the previous year. Later the same month, he was announced as the 2007 Mind Champion of the Year, in recognition of the success of his documentary The Secret Life of a Manic Depressive in raising awareness of bipolar disorder. He was also nominated in "Best Entertainment Performance" for QI and "Best Factual Series" for Secret Life of the Manic Depressive at the British Academy Television Awards 2007. That same year, Broadcast magazine listed Fry at number four in its "Hot 100" list of influential on-screen performers, describing him as a polymath and a "national treasure".

BBC Four dedicated two nights of programming to Fry on 17 and 18 August 2007, in celebration of his 50th birthday. The first night, comprising programmes featuring Fry, began with a sixty-minute documentary entitled Stephen Fry: 50 Not Out. The second night was composed of programmes selected by Fry, as well as a 60-minute interview with Mark Lawson and a half-hour special, Stephen Fry: Guilty. The weekend programming proved such a ratings hit for BBC Four that it was repeated on BBC Two on 16 and 17 September 2007. Fry was granted a lifetime achievement award at the British Comedy Awards on 5 December 2007. In 2009, he was elected an Honorary Fellow of the Royal College of Psychiatrists (Hon FRCPsych). On 20 January 2010, he was also granted the Special Recognition Award at the National Television Awards .

He was made honorary president of the Cambridge University Quiz Society and honorary fellow of his alma mater Queens' College, Cambridge. On 13 July 2010, he was made an honorary fellow of Cardiff University, and on 28 January 2011, he was made an honorary Doctor of the University (DUniv) by the University of Sussex, in recognition of his work campaigning for people suffering from mental health problems, bipolar disorder, and HIV. He is a Patron of the Norwich Playhouse theatre and a Vice-President of The Noël Coward Society.

In 2011, Fry was the subject of Molly Lewis's song An Open Letter to Stephen Fry, in which the singer jokingly offers herself as a surrogate mother for his child. In February 2011, Fry was awarded the Outstanding Lifetime Achievement Award in Cultural Humanism by the Humanist Chaplaincy at Harvard University, the Harvard Secular Society and the American Humanist Association.

In 2012, Fry wrote the foreword to the Union of UEA Students report on the student experience for LGBT+ members. As recognition of his public support for LGBT+ rights and for the Union's report, the Union of UEA Students awarded him, on 18 October 2012, Honorary Life Membership of the Union. In March 2014, Fry beat David Attenborough and Davina McCall to win the Best Presenter award at the Royal Television Society Programme Awards. The award was given for his BBC2 programme Stephen Fry: Out There. In an episode of QI, "M-Merriment", originally broadcast in December 2015, Fry was awarded membership of The Magic Circle.

In 2017, Fry became the latest patron of the Norwich Film Festival, and said he was "Very proud now to be a patron of a festival that encourages people from Norfolk, Norwich and beyond to be enchanted, beguiled and entranced by all kinds of film that might not otherwise reach them." In the same year, the bird louse Saepocephalum stephenfryii was named after him, in honour of his contributions to the popularization of science as host of QI. In 2019, Fry was elected a Fellow of the Royal Society of Literature (FRSL). Stephen Fry was the Honorary President of the Classical Association between 2021 and 2022.

In 2021, Fry was appointed a Grand Commander of the Order of the Phoenix by Greek president Katerina Sakellaropoulou "for his contribution in enhancing knowledge about Greece in the United Kingdom and reinforcing ties between our two countries." In 2023, he was elected a Fellow of the Society of Authors. Fry was awarded as an Honorary Fellow of the Royal Canadian Geographical Society (FRCGS) in 2024.

In the 2025 New Year Honours, Fry was knighted by King Charles III "for services to mental health awareness, the environment and to charity". The same year, the Belgian university KU Leuven conferred an honorary doctorate (Dr.h.c.) upon Fry to "commend him for his passion for language and culture, his impressive contributions to the public debate, and his call for an open dialogue on mental health". Fry is also a Fellow of the Royal Society of Arts (FRSA).

== Personal life ==
Fry married comedian Elliott Spencer in January 2015 in Dereham, Norfolk. Fry lives in West Bilney in Norfolk. He became friends with King Charles III while Charles was Prince of Wales, through his work with The Prince's Trust. He attended the then-Prince's wedding to Camilla Parker Bowles in 2005. He is also a friend of Rowan Atkinson and was best man at Atkinson's wedding to Sunetra Sastry at the Russian Tea Room in New York City. He was a friend of Sir John Mills. His best friend is Hugh Laurie, whom he met while both were at Cambridge and with whom he has collaborated many times over the years. He was the best man at Laurie's wedding and is the godfather to all three of his children.

Fry started using cocaine in his twenties and continued until 2001. He wrote about his drug use in the memoir More Fool Me (2014).

A fan of cricket, Fry has stated that he is related to former England cricketer C. B. Fry, and was interviewed for the Ashes Fever DVD, reporting on England's victory over Australia in the 2005 Ashes series. Regarding football, he is a supporter of Norwich City FC, and is a regular visitor to their home ground at Carrow Road. He has been described as "deeply dippy for all things digital" and claims to have bought the third Macintosh computer sold in the UK (his friend Douglas Adams bought the first two). He jokes that he has never encountered a smartphone that he has not purchased. He counts Wikipedia among his favourite websites.

Fry has a long-standing interest in Internet production, stating in a discussion with the inventor of the World Wide Web Tim Berners-Lee that Fry built his own website as early as 1994, and that this was the first URL printed in a British newspaper. His site, The New Adventures of Mr Stephen Fry, has existed since 2002 and has attracted many visitors following his first blog in September 2007, which consisted of a 6,500-word "blessay" on smartphones. In February 2008, he launched his private podcast series, Stephen Fry's Podgrams (defunct), and a forum, including discussions on depression and activities in which he is involved. The website content is created by Fry and produced by Andrew Sampson. Fry's weekly gadget column Dork Talk appeared in The Guardian from November 2007 to October 2008. Fry is also a supporter of GNU and the Free Software Foundation. For the 25th anniversary of the GNU operating system, Fry appeared in a video explaining some of the philosophy behind GNU by likening it to the sharing found in science.

When in London, he drives a dark green TX4 Hackney carriage. This vehicle has been featured in Fry's production, Stephen Fry in America.

On 16 April 2018, Fry released the first episode of a new podcast, "Stephen Fry's 7 Deadly Sins", available on his website and other podcasting platforms. The first episode of the second series was released on 13 January 2020 and continued to be released over the course of nine weeks. In 2019, he was featured in the filmed poem rendition Love Goes Never Alone, for the online theatre publication First Night Magazine in support of the LGBTQ+ community.

In 2023, during an "alternative Christmas message" broadcast on Channel 4, Fry remarked that he was proud of his Jewish heritage. He said: "I've been on lists of British Jews that some ultra-right-wing newspapers and sites have published over the years. And I'm frankly damned if I'll let antisemites be the ones who define me, and take ownership of the word 'Jew', injecting it with their own spiteful venom. So I accept and claim the identity with pride, I am Stephen Fry, and I am a Jew."

Enabled by a 2020 change in citizenship legislation in Austria, Fry acquired Austrian citizenship in 2024, as did all of his siblings, as a descendant of persons who were persecuted by Nazism and who lost their Austrian citizenship as a consequence. Fry thus regained the citizenship his ancestors forcibly lost.

=== Sexuality ===
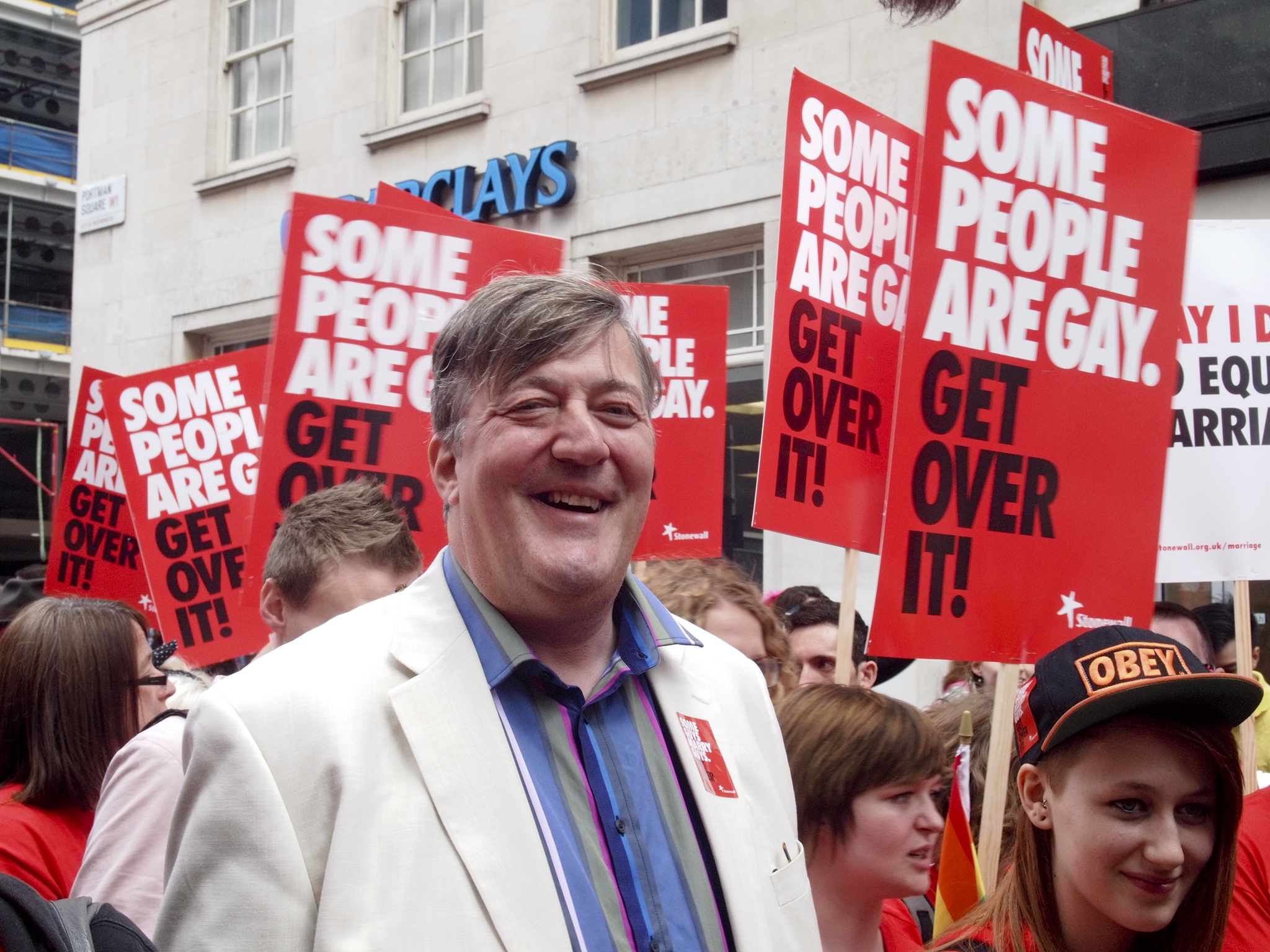
Fry with Stonewall marchers at WorldPride 2012 in London

Fry struggled to keep his homosexuality secret during his teenage years at public school, and by his own account did not engage in sexual activity for 16 years between 1979 and 1995. When asked when he first acknowledged his sexuality, Fry quipped: "I suppose it all began when I came out of the womb. I looked back up at my mother and thought to myself, 'That's the last time I'm going up one of those'." In his 1997 autobiography titled Moab Is My Washpot, however, Fry attributed the joke to "a friend at university", adding, "I have since shamelessly used this as my own explanation of When I Knew."

Fry was in a 15-year relationship with Daniel Cohen that ended in 2010. Fry was listed number 2 in 2016 and number 12 in 2017 on the Pride Power list. On 6 January 2015, British tabloid The Sun reported that Fry would marry his partner, comedian Elliott Spencer. Fry wrote on Twitter: "It looks as though a certain cat is out of a certain bag. I'm very very happy of course but had hoped for a private wedding. Fat chance!" Eleven days after the news story, Fry married Spencer on 17 January at Dereham in Norfolk.

=== Political views ===
Fry was an active supporter of the Labour Party for many years and appeared in a party political broadcast on its behalf with Hugh Laurie and Michelle Collins in November 1993. He did not vote in the 2005 general election because of the Iraq War. Despite his praise of the Blair/Brown government's social policy, Fry criticised Labour's Third Way concept. Fry appeared in campaign literature to support changing the British electoral system from first-past-the-post to alternative vote for electing members of parliament to the House of Commons in the Alternative Vote referendum of 2011.

On 30 April 2008, Fry signed an open letter, published in The Guardian newspaper by several Jewish personalities, stating their opposition to celebrating the 60th anniversary of the founding of the state of Israel. He is a signatory member of the British Jews for Justice for Palestinians (JJP) organisation, which campaigns for Palestinian rights.

Fry was among over 100 signatories to a statement published by Sense about Science on 4 June 2009, condemning British libel laws and their use to "severely curtail the right to free speech on a matter of public interest".

In August 2013, Fry published an open letter to the British Prime Minister David Cameron and the International Olympic Committee calling for a boycott of the 2014 Winter Olympics in Sochi, due to concerns over the state-sanctioned persecution of LGBTQ people in Russia under the 2013 anti-"gay propaganda" laws. Cameron stated on Twitter that he believed "we can better challenge prejudice as we attend, rather than boycotting the Winter Olympics".

In March 2014, Fry publicly backed "Hacked Off" and its campaign towards press self-regulation by "safeguarding the press from political interference while also giving vital protection to the vulnerable". He said in 2015 that the Daily Mail editor Paul Dacre "has done more to damage the Britain I love than any single person".

In April 2016, Fry caused controversy by accusing survivors of child sexual abuse of self-pity for expecting trigger warnings. Soon after, he apologised for his comments.

On 18 May 2018, Fry participated in the semi-annual Munk Debates in Toronto, Canada, where he argued against political correctness on the Con side of the topic "Be it resolved, what you call political correctness, I call progress..." alongside Jordan Peterson, and in opposition to the Pro side represented by Michelle Goldberg and Michael Eric Dyson. During the debate, Fry paraphrased a famous sentence from the 1923 essay I Am Afraid, in which Old Bolshevik-turned-Soviet dissident Yevgeny Zamyatin denounced censorship in the Soviet Union. The original sentence reads, "True literature can exist only when it is created, not by diligent and reliable officials, but by madmen, hermits, heretics, dreamers, rebels, and skeptics." Fry's rendering, however, reads, "Progress is not achieved by preachers and guardians of morality, but by madmen, hermits, heretics, dreamers, rebels, and sceptics."

On 1 February 2021, Fry supported the petition of two Holocaust survivors, Dorit Oliver-Wolff and Ruth Barnett, who were asking to meet Prime Minister Boris Johnson regarding the 'genocide amendment' to the trade bill; this amendment would allow an independent parliamentary judicial committee to examine evidence of genocide. In a tweet, Fry highlighted the plight of the Uyghurs.

Fry has spoken out publicly in support of the return of the Elgin Marbles.

In June 2025, Fry spoke out against Harry Potter series author JK Rowling for her views on transgender people, calling her a "lost cause" and "radicalised".

==== Poland controversy ====
On 6 October 2009, Fry was interviewed by Jon Snow on Channel 4 News as a signatory of a letter to Conservative Party leader David Cameron expressing concern about the party forming a political alliance with the right-wing Polish Law and Justice party in the European Parliament. During the interview, he stated:

There has been a history, let's face it, in Poland of a right-wing Catholicism which has been deeply disturbing for those of us who know a little history, and remember which side of the border Auschwitz was on and know the stories, and know much of the antisemitic, and homophobic and nationalistic elements in countries like Poland.

The remark prompted a complaint from the Polish Embassy in London, an editorial in The Economist and criticism from British Jewish historian David Cesarani. Fry later posted an apology in a six-page post on his personal blog, in which he apologised for his remarks, stating that "I didn't even really at the time notice the import of what I had said, so gave myself no opportunity instantly to retract the statement. It was a rubbishy, cheap and offensive remark that I have been regretting ever since. I take this opportunity to apologise now." and "It detracted from and devalued my argument, such as it was, and it outraged and offended a large group of people for no very good reason."

=== Health ===
Fry has cyclothymia, a form of bipolar disorder (considered to be a milder type). Fry has spoken publicly about his experience with the condition, which was depicted in the documentary Stephen Fry: The Secret Life of the Manic Depressive. In the programme, he interviewed other people with bipolar disorder including Carrie Fisher, Richard Dreyfuss and Tony Slattery. He also interviewed Robbie Williams, who suffered with unipolar depression, and they discussed the differences and similarities of their mental health experiences and diagnoses. He is involved with the mental health charity Stand to Reason and is president of Mind. In 2013, he said that, in the previous year, he had started taking medication for the first time, in an attempt to control his condition. In 2018, alongside Nadiya Hussain and Olly Alexander, Fry was part of Sport Relief's attempt to raise awareness of mental health.

In 1995, while appearing in the West End play Cell Mates, Fry had a nervous breakdown and walked out of the production, causing its early closure and incurring the displeasure of co-star Rik Mayall and playwright Simon Gray. Fry went missing for several days and contemplated suicide. He later said that he would have killed himself if he had not had "the option of disappearing". He abandoned the idea and left the United Kingdom by ferry, eventually resurfacing in Belgium. Fry has attempted suicide on a number of occasions, most recently in 2012. In an interview with Richard Herring in 2013, Fry said that he had attempted suicide the previous year while filming abroad. He said that he took a "huge number of pills and a huge [amount] of vodka" and had to be brought back to the UK to be "looked after".

In January 2008, Fry broke his arm while filming Last Chance to See in Brazil. While climbing aboard a boat, he slipped between it and the dock, and, stopping himself from falling into the water, his body weight snapped his right humerus. The resulting vulnerability to his radial nerve – which affects use of the arm – was not diagnosed until he saw a consultant in the UK.

Appearing on the BBC's Top Gear in 2009, Fry had lost a significant amount of weight, and explained that he had shed a total of 6 stone (84 lb; 38 kg). He attributed the weight loss to walking while listening to audiobooks. Fry is between 6 feet 4 inches (1.93 m) and 6 feet 5 inches (1.96 m) in height. Fry has prosopagnosia ("face blindness").

In February 2018, Fry announced that he was recovering from an operation to treat prostate cancer, involving the removal of the prostate and 11 adjacent lymph nodes. He described the cancer as aggressive and said that early intervention had saved his life.

In March 2021, Fry hailed the "wonderful moment" of receiving the Oxford–AstraZeneca COVID vaccine at Westminster Abbey. The University of Cambridge alumnus joked that he would have to "put petty rivalries behind [him]".

On 14 September 2023, Fry was taken to a hospital after he fell about 6 ft (1.8 m) onto a concrete floor when exiting the stage following a conference on artificial intelligence at The O2 Arena in Greenwich. He sustained injuries to his ribs and legs. After a recovery period, he was reported to be back at work on 9 December.

=== Views on religion ===
Fry has repeatedly expressed opposition to organised religion, and has identified himself as an atheist and humanist, while declaring some sympathy for the ancient Greek belief in gods. In his first autobiography, he described how he once considered ordination to the Anglican priesthood, but came to the conclusion that he "couldn't believe in God, because [he] was fundamentally Hellenic in [his] outlook". He has stated that religion can have positive effects: "Sometimes belief means credulity, sometimes an expression of faith and hope which even the most sceptical atheist such as myself cannot but find inspiring." Fry claims to have been expelled from Salt Lake City, Utah, because of a joke made about doctrines of the Church of Jesus Christ of Latter-day Saints.

In 2009, The Guardian published a letter from Fry addressing his younger self, explaining how his future is soon to unfold, reflecting on the positive progression towards gay acceptance and openness around him, and yet not everywhere, while warning on how "the cruel, hypocritical and loveless hand of religion and absolutism has fallen on the world once more". Later that year, he and Christopher Hitchens participated in an "Intelligence Squared" debate in which they argued against Ann Widdecombe and Archbishop John Onaiyekan, who supported the view that the Catholic Church was a force for good. Fry and Hitchens argued that the church did more harm than good, and were declared the victors after an audience vote. Fry attacked the Catholic Church's teachings on sexuality and denounced its wealth.

In 2010, Fry was made a Distinguished Supporter of the British Humanist Association, stating: "it is essential to nail one's colours to the mast as a humanist." Later that year, Fry joined 54 other public figures in signing an open letter published in The Guardian stating their opposition to Pope Benedict XVI's visit to the United Kingdom being a state visit. On 22 February 2011, Fry was presented with the Lifetime Achievement Award in Cultural Humanism by the Humanist Chaplaincy at Harvard University.

When interviewed in 2015 by the Irish broadcaster Gay Byrne, Fry was asked what he would say if he came face-to-face with God, to which he replied: "Bone cancer in children: what's that about? How dare you? How dare you create a world where there is such misery that's not our fault? It's utterly, utterly evil. Why should I respect a capricious, mean-minded, stupid God who creates a world which is so full of injustice and pain?" Within days, the video was viewed over five million times. Fry later stated he did not refer to any specific religion: "I said quite a few things that were angry at this supposed God. I was merely saying things that Bertrand Russell and many finer heads of the mind have said for many thousands of years, going all the way back to the Greeks." "Because the God who created this universe, if it was created by God, is quite clearly a maniac, utter maniac." In May 2017, it was announced that Fry, along with broadcaster RTÉ, were under criminal investigation for blasphemy under the Irish Defamation Act 2009, following a complaint from a member of the public about the broadcast: the case was dropped after Gardaí confirmed that they had not been able to locate a sufficient number of offended people. The following year, in 2018, the article on blasphemy was removed from the Irish Constitution following a referendum.

Fry has praised Anglican priest Michael Coren's book The Rebel Christ, saying: "Integrity, wit and passion. A fine advocate for the best of Christian thought and a faith that encompasses the human as well as the divine."

== Ventures ==
=== Narration ===
Fry is known for his extensive voice-over work; he read all seven of the Harry Potter novels for the UK audiobook recordings, narrated Paddington Bear audiobooks, narrated the video game series LittleBigPlanet and Birds of Steel, narrated an animated series of explanations of the laws of cricket and narrated a series of animations about humanism for Humanists UK.

=== Twitter ===
Fry wielded a considerable amount of influence through his use of Twitter. He was frequently asked to promote various charities and causes, often inadvertently causing their websites to crash because of the volume of traffic generated by his large number of followers; as Fry noted on his website: "Four thousand hits a second all diving down the pipeline at the same time for minutes on end." He used his influence to recommend underexposed musicians and authors (who often saw large increases in web hits and sales) and to raise awareness of contemporary issues in the world of media and politics, notably the dropping of an injunction against The Guardian and public anger over Daily Mail columnist Jan Moir's article on the death of Boyzone member Stephen Gately.

In November 2009, Fry's Twitter account reached one million followers. He commemorated the million-followers milestone with a humorous video blog in which a 'Step Hen Fry' clone speaks from the year 2034, where MySpace, Facebook and Twitter have combined to form 'Twit on MyFace'. In November 2010, he welcomed his two-millionth follower with a blog entry detailing his opinions and experiences of Twitter. On 11 March 2012, Fry noted his passing of the four-million-followers mark with a tweet: "Lordy I've breasted the 4 million followers tape. Love you all. Yes even YOU. But let's dedicate today to Douglas Adams's diamond jubilee". As of June 2021 he had 12.4 million followers.

Fry had a history of temporarily distancing himself from the social networking site which began when he received criticism in October 2009. However, he retracted the announcement that he would be leaving the following day. In October 2010, Fry left Twitter for a few days, with a farewell message of "Bye bye", following press criticism of a quote taken from an interview he had given. After returning, he explained that he had left Twitter to "avoid being sympathised with or told about an article" he "would otherwise never have got wind of". The methods Fry uses on Twitter have been criticised. On 15 February 2016, Fry deleted his Twitter account after receiving criticism for a tweet commenting on Jenny Beavan's outfit choice at that year's BAFTAs where she received an award for costume design. Fry alluded to this on an April 2016 episode of The Rubin Report in which he criticised groupthink mentality and stated that his return to Twitter was a "maybe". He returned to Twitter in August 2016. He left Twitter again in November 2022, joining Mastodon that same month.

=== Sport ===
In August 2010, Fry joined the board of directors at Norwich City Football Club. A lifelong fan of "the Canaries" and a regular visitor to Carrow Road, he said, on being appointed, "Truly this is one of the most exciting days of my life, and I am as proud and pleased as I could be." Fry stepped down from his Board position in January 2016, to take up a new position as "Norwich City Ambassador". Fry said, "My five years in the role have been an honour and a privilege beyond almost anything I can remember. I wish I could take credit for ushering the club up from League One to the Premiership during that time on the Board. Actually, I'm going to. It was all me. It can't have been a coincidence ... But now I'm so happy to relinquish my seat on the board to Thomas Smith and to engage as fully as I can in the role of ambassador for Norwich City." In February 2014, Fry became the honorary president of Proud Canaries, a supporters' group for Norwich City's lesbian, gay, bisexual and transgender fans.

Fry succeeded Clare Connor to become president of Marylebone Cricket Club on 1 October 2022, relinquishing the role after one year to his successor Mark Nicholas in 2023.

=== Business ===
In 2008, Fry formed SamFry Ltd, with long-term collaborator Andrew Sampson to produce and fund new material and to manage his official website. Fry is the co-owner, with Gina Carter and Sandi Toksvig, of Sprout Pictures, an independent film and television company.

In 2016, Fry launched Pindex, "a self-funded online platform that creates and curates educational videos and infographics for teachers and students", founded and run by a four-person team.

=== Charity ===
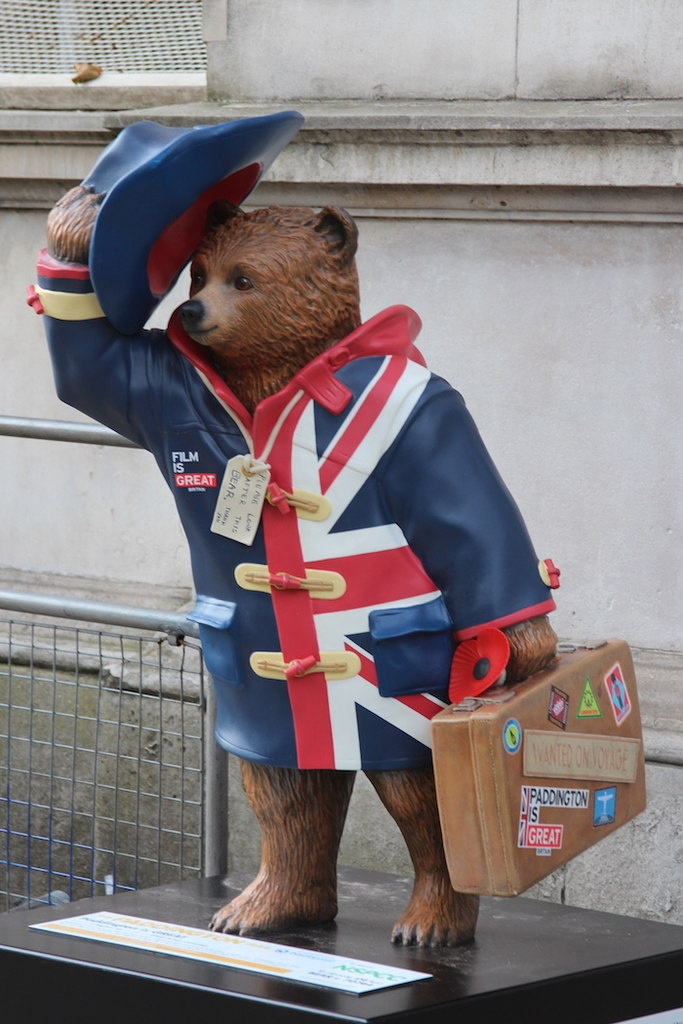
Fry's Paddington Bear statue—themed "Paddington is Great"—at 10 Downing Street in London, auctioned to raise funds for the NSPCC

In 2008, Fry appeared in a film made by the Free Software Foundation to celebrate the 25th anniversary of the GNU Project to create a completely free operating system. In the film, Fry explains the principles of software freedom central to the development of the Linux and GNU software projects. For the Comic Relief telethon in 2011, Fry was one of four celebrities who represented a new flavour of Walkers crisps: Stephen Fry Up, with the flavour inspired by the full English breakfast (also known as a 'fry up'). In 2014, Fry designed a Paddington Bear statue, one of fifty located around London prior to the release of the film Paddington, which was auctioned to raise funds for the National Society for the Prevention of Cruelty to Children (NSPCC).

Fry is a supporter of nature and wildlife conservation. He has been the president of the Great Fen Project since 2006 and vice-president of international NGO Fauna and Flora International since 2009. Fry has also expressed support for action on climate change and activist group Extinction Rebellion, and has criticized climate change denial.

In April 2020, during the COVID-19 pandemic, Fry appeared in a sketch alongside Prince William for a charity show titled The Big Night In on BBC One. In the lighthearted sketch, Fry reprises his Blackadder character Lord Melchett, who is on a Zoom call with the then Duke of Cambridge as they talk about television shows such as EastEnders and Tiger King as well as homeschooling. The sketch had been put together by Comic Relief and Children in Need to raise money and keep people entertained during the lockdown. In March 2021, Fry narrated a short film for Cambridge Children's Hospital.

Fry has been the patron of UK audiobook charity Listening Books since 2005.

== Selected works ==
=== As author ===
Fiction

- Fry, Stephen (1991). The Liar. Soho. ISBN 978-0-939149-82-7.
- Fry, Stephen (1994). The Hippopotamus. Soho Press. ISBN 978-1-56947-054-1.
- Fry, Stephen (1996). Making History. Arrow. ISBN 978-0-09-946481-5.
- Fry, Stephen (2000). The Stars' Tennis Balls. Hutchinson. ISBN 978-0-09-180151-9. US edition
- Fry, Edna; Fry, Stephen (2010). Mrs Fry's Diary. Hodder & Stoughton. ISBN 978-1-4447-2077-8.

Non-fiction

- Fry, Stephen (1992). Paperweight. William Heinemann. ISBN 978-0434274086.
- Fry, Stephen (2002). Rescuing the Spectacled Bear: A Peruvian Diary. Hutchinson. ISBN 978-0-8129-6819-4.
- Fry, Stephen; Lihoreau, Tim (2004). Stephen Fry's Incomplete and Utter History of Classical Music. Macmillan. ISBN 9780752225340.
- Fry, Stephen (2005). The Ode Less Travelled: Unlocking the Poet Within. Hutchinson. ISBN 978-0091795238.
- Fry, Stephen (2010). Stephen Fry in America. William Morrow. ISBN 978-0061456381.
- Fry, Stephen (2017). Mythos: A Retelling of the Myths of Ancient Greece. Michael Joseph. ISBN 978-0718188726.
- Fry, Stephen (2018). Heroes. Michael Joseph. ISBN 978-0241380369.
- Fry, Stephen (2020). Troy. Michael Joseph. ISBN 978-0241424599.
- Fry, Stephen (2021). Fry's Ties: the Life and Times of a Tie Collection. Michael Joseph. ISBN 978-0241493045.
- Fry, Stephen (2024). Odyssey. Michael Joseph. ISBN 978-0241486368.

Autobiography

- Fry, Stephen (1997). Moab Is My Washpot: An Autobiography. Soho Press. ISBN 978-1-56947-202-6.
- Fry, Stephen (2010). The Fry Chronicles: An Autobiography. Michael Joseph. ISBN 978-0-7181-5483-7.
- Fry, Stephen (2014). More Fool Me: A Memoir. Michael Joseph. ISBN 978-0718179786.

Scripts from A Bit of Fry & Laurie

- Fry, Stephen; Laurie, Hugh (1990). A Bit of Fry and Laurie. Mandarin. ISBN 978-0-7493-0705-9.
- Fry, Stephen; Laurie, Hugh (1991). A Bit More Fry and Laurie. Mandarin. ISBN 978-0749310769.
- Fry, Stephen; Laurie, Hugh (1992). 3 Bits of Fry and Laurie. Mandarin. ISBN 978-0434271931.
- Fry, Stephen; Laurie, Hugh (1995). Fry and Laurie 4. Mandarin. ISBN 978-0749319670.

=== Audio books ===
- Adams, Douglas (2005). The Hitchhiker's Guide to the Galaxy (Audiobook, narr. by Stephen Fry). Random House Audio.
- Fry, Stephen, (1999-2007). "Harry Potter Audiobooks (Narrated by Stephen Fry)"
- Fry, Stephen, (2009). Short Stories by Anton Chekhov (Stephen Fry Presents). ISBN 978-0007316373
- Fry, Stephen (2017). Fry's English Delight. Audible Studios. ISBN 978-1536635058.
- Fry, Stephen, 2017. "Eugene Onegin Alexander Pushkin Audiobook" (Stephen Fry Reads James E. Fallen, trans. Eugene Onegin)
- Fry, Stephen, (2017). "Sherlock Holmes: The Definitive Collection"
- Fry, Stephen (2017). Mythos: The Greek Myths Retold (Audiobook, narr. by Stephen Fry). Penguin Audio. ISBN 978-1405934329.
- Fry, Stephen (2018). Heroes: Mortals and Monsters, Quests and Adventures (Audiobook, narr. by Stephen Fry). Penguin Audio. ISBN 978-1405940566.
- Fry, Stephen (2020). Troy: The Siege of Troy Retold (Audiobook, narr. by Stephen Fry). Penguin Books Ltd. ISBN 978-1405944731.
- Fry, Stephen (2023). Odyssey: The Great Myth Retold (Audiobook, narr. by Stephen Fry). Penguin Audio. ISBN 978-1405948401.

=== As contributor ===
- Lloyd, John; Fry, Stephen; Mitchinson, John (2006). John Mitchinson (ed.). The Book of General Ignorance. Faber and Faber. ISBN 978-0-571-23368-7.
- Carwardine, Mark; Fry, Stephen (2009). Last Chance to See. HarperCollins Publishers Limited. ISBN 978-0-00-729072-7.

=== Forewords ===
- Højer, Torsten, ed. (2016). Speak My Language, and Other Stories: An Anthology of Gay Fiction. Constable & Robinson. ISBN 978-1472119971.
- Whittard, Tim, ed. (2020). Mental & Behavioural State Examination: Theory into Practice – A Nurse's Perspective on Psychiatric Assessment. The Choir Press. ISBN 978-1789630954.
- Hitchens, Christopher; Dawkins, Richard; Harris, Sam; Dennett, Daniel, eds. (2019). The Four Horsemen: The Conversation That Sparked an Atheist Revolution. Random House. ISBN 978-0525511953.
- Davies, Kevin Jon, ed. (2023). 42: The Wildly Improbable Ideas of Douglas Adams. Unbound. ISBN 9781800182684.

== See also ==
- List of atheists in film, radio, television and theatre

Academic offices
Preceded by Paul Henderson Scott	Rector of the University of Dundee; 1992–1998	Succeeded by Tony Slattery
