= Fry's English Delight =

- Genre: Documentary
- Running time: 30 minutes
- Country of origin: United Kingdom
- Language(s): English
- Home station: BBC Radio 4
- Starring: Stephen Fry
- Created by: Testbed Productions www.testbed.co.uk
- Produced by: Nick Baker, Sarah Cuddon, Merilyn Harris, Ian Gardhouse
- Original release: 25 August 2008
- No. of series: 10 (plus one winter special)
- No. of episodes: 37
- Website: Fry's English Delight

Fry's English Delight is a BBC Radio 4 documentary series in which language enthusiast Stephen Fry explores various aspects of the English language.

The title is an allusion to the British confectionery Fry's Turkish Delight.

== Episode guide ==
Series	Episode	Title	First broadcast
1	1	Metaphor	25 Aug 2008
1	2	Quotation	1 Sep 2008
1	3	Cliché	8 Sep 2008
2	1	So Wrong It's Right	11 Aug 2009
2	2	Speaking Proper	18 Aug 2009
2	3	Hallo!	25 Aug 2009
3	1	The Trial of Qwerty	11 Aug 2010
3	2	He Said, She Said	18 Aug 2010
3	3	Accentuate the Negative	25 Aug 2010
3	4	Future Conditional	1 Sep 2010
Winter Special		Word Games	28 Dec 2010
4	1	The Mouth	11 Jul 2011
4	2	Brevity	18 Jul 2011
4	3	Persuasion	25 Jul 2011
4	4	Class	1 Aug 2011
5	1	Colourful Language	16 Aug 2012
5	2	Intonation	23 Aug 2012
5	3	Conversation	30 Aug 2012
5	4	The Story of X	6 Sep 2012
6	1	Rhetoric Rehabilitated	26 Aug 2013
6	2	Spelling	2 Sep 2013
6	3	Words without End	9 Sep 2013
6	4	WTF	16 Sep 2013
7	1	Magic	4 Aug 2014
7	2	Capital Punishment	11 Aug 2014
7	3	Reading Aloud	18 Aug 2014
7	4	Plain English	25 Aug 2014
8	1	Words Fail Me	12 Aug 2015
8	2	Talking about the Weather	18 Aug 2015
8	3	Do You Promise Not to Tell?	25 Aug 2015
8	4	English Plus One	1 Sep 2015
9	1	Let's Get Physical	5 Feb 2017
9	2	The Story of Oh!	12 Feb 2017
9	3	English Upside Down	19 Feb 2017
9	4	That Way Madness Lies	26 Feb 2017
10	1	Order!	6 Aug 2019
10	2	You Must Remember This	13 Aug 2019
10	3	The Doolittle Factor	20 Aug 2019
10	4	Signs of the Times	27 Aug 2019

== Audiobooks ==
Up to series 7, every episode of Fry's English Delight has been released on CD and is also currently available in the form of audio downloads. The first series also contains the 2007 documentary Current Puns presented by Fry on Radio 4 on 26 December 2007. The second series contains the 2006 documentary The Joy of Gibberish, presented by Fry on Radio 4 on 3 January 2006.

Series	CD release date
Series 1	4 June 2009
Series 2	29 March 2010
Series 3	11 October 2010
Word Games	7 July 2011
Series 4	8 September 2011
Series 5	20 September 2012
Series 6	12 September 2013
Series 7	12 September 2014
