= Saturday Night Fry =

BBC Radio comedy series

- Cover of CD release
- Other names: Fry on Saturday
- Genre: comedy sketch show
- Running time: 29 minutes
- Country of origin: United Kingdom
- Language(s): English
- Home station: BBC Radio 4
- TV adaptations: precursor to A Bit of Fry and Laurie
- Hosted by: Stephen Fry
- Starring: Jim Broadbent; Emma Thompson; Phyllida Law; Robert Bathurst; Julia Hills; Alison Steadman; Barry Cryer; Hugh Laurie
- Recording studio: Broadcasting House, London
- Original release: 19 December 1987 – 4 June 1988
- No. of series: 1
- No. of episodes: 6
- Opening theme: "Saturday Night Fish Fry" (Louis Jordan and His Tympany Five)

Saturday Night Fry is a six-part comedy series on BBC Radio 4 that was broadcast between 30 April and 4 June 1988. The first episode had previously been broadcast as a pilot on 19 December 1987.

A different show of the same name aired on BBC Radio 4 in 1998, again hosted by Fry. This was a series of serious 45-minute debates interspersed with occasional sketches and pieces of music.

== Format ==
Hosted by Stephen Fry—accompanied each week by a selection of guests including Jim Broadbent, Emma Thompson, Phyllida Law, Robert Bathurst, Julia Hills, Alison Steadman and long-time collaborator Hugh Laurie—the show took the form of a round table discussion and sketches which veered tangentially from the sublime to the ridiculous. Parodies of television and radio formats were common ('Fat Man on a Bicycle', and so on).

Snippets of classical music were used to mark breaks between items, usually succeeded by Fry's voice saying, "And as the strains of the [name of piece] fade away, we turn to..." On one occasion, in line with a running joke throughout the episode, the last of these in the show was said as " And as the strains of Julia being slapped fades away..."

Certain editions were constructed in complex knots: one edition saw the cast rearranging the script as a practical joke whilst Fry has gone to the toilet, ending up in him reading the part where they do that and so finding them red-handed, whilst the first edition fell in and out of dream sequences caused by a devilish potion.

Although slightly different in format the series could be seen as a direct precursor to A Bit of Fry and Laurie, the 1989 television series (piloted in 1987), which employed a very similar style of humour and wordplay: it included the fictional language "Strom", and the phrase "Mr. Music, will you play?".

The signature tune opening each episode was "Saturday Night Fish Fry" by Louis Jordan. This would always be preceded by a rather convoluted introduction from Fry.

== Release ==
In 2009, the series was released on a triple compact disc set by BBC Audio in June and reaired the following month on BBC Radio 7.
