= Making History (novel) =

1996 novel by Stephen Fry

- Author: Stephen Fry
- Language: English
- Genre: Alternative history, time travel
- Publisher: Hutchinson
- Publication date: 1996
- Publication place: United Kingdom
- Media type: Print (hardback & paperback)
- Pages: 380
- ISBN: 0-09-179141-3
- OCLC: 42725962
- Dewey Decimal: 823/.914 21
- LC Class: PR6056.R88 M34 1996

Making History (1996) is the third novel by Stephen Fry. Its plot involves the creation of an alternative historical timeline in which Adolf Hitler never existed. While most of the book is written in standard prose, a couple of chapters are written in the format of a screenplay. The book won the Sidewise Award for Alternate History.

== Plot ==
=== Changing history ===
The story is told in first person by Michael "Puppy" Young, a young history student at Cambridge University on the verge of completing his doctoral thesis on the early life of Adolf Hitler and his mother. He meets Professor Leo Zuckerman, a physicist who has a strong personal interest in Hitler, the rise of Nazism and the Holocaust. Michael assumes this is due to his Jewish heritage. However, it is later revealed that Leo was born Axil Bauer, the son of Dietrich Bauer, a Nazi doctor at Auschwitz who – when the Nazi defeat became certain – gave his son the identity of a Jewish doctor that he murdered. Leo has developed a machine that enables the past to be viewed—but it is of no practical use as the image is not resolvable into details. Together, they hatch a plan to modify the machine such that it can be used to send something back in time. They decide to use a permanent male contraceptive pill, stolen from Michael's girlfriend (a biochemistry researcher), who, due to his continual distraction, has left him to take a position at Princeton University. They decide to send the pill back in time to the well in Braunau am Inn so that Hitler's father will drink from it and become infertile, with the result that Hitler will never be born.

=== Consequences ===
The result of preventing the birth of Adolf Hitler with the contraceptive pill is that history has become worse. The Nazi leadership develops nuclear weapons and commits genocide against Jews using a sterilizing water based on the contraceptive pill.

When Michael awakens he is completely disoriented. He soon discovers that he is in the United States, at Princeton University. Everyone he encounters is surprised that he is speaking with an English accent. It takes some time for Michael's memory to return. He realises that his plan was successful, history has changed, and for some reason his parents must have moved to America. Initially he is elated and tells his new friend Steve how happy he is because Steve has never heard of Hitler, Braunau am Inn, or the Nazi Party. Steve corrects Michael and reveals that, while never hearing of Hitler, he is all too aware of the Nazi Party.

Michael begins to discover the history of this new world. It turns out that without Hitler, a new leader emerged, Rudolf Gloder, who was equally ruthless. In fact, Michael and Zuckerman have replaced Hitler with a Nazi leader who was even more charming, patient, and effective, and as committed to the Final Solution as Hitler had been.

In this alternative timeline, the Nazis won a mandate in the Reichstag in 1932 and built up an electronics industry of their own. Unlike Hitler, Gloder proceeded with stealth, ensuring peaceful unification with Austria in 1937. More alarmingly, Gloder's Nazis also had a head start on the research and development of nuclear weapons, which led to the destruction of Moscow and Leningrad, eliminating Joseph Stalin and his Politburo in this alternative 1938. The Greater German Reich annexes Czechoslovakia, Hungary, Yugoslavia, Poland, and Turkey, and invades the remnants of the former Soviet Union. In 1939, France, the United Kingdom, Scandinavia, and the Benelux nations capitulate, although Britain rebels in 1941, leading to the execution of several dissidents, among them the Duke of York (the historical King George VI) and George Orwell. Jews are exiled to a "Jewish Free State" within the former Yugoslavia, where most of this world's Holocaust occurs. The United States develops nuclear weapons in 1941, leading to a Cold War between Nazi Europe and the United States. The latter has never gone to war against the Japanese Empire in the Pacific.

As a result, this United States has become far more socially conservative. Because there was no sixties upsurge of social liberalism and decriminalisation of homosexuality in (Nazi-occupied) Western Europe in this world, in the US the latter is still a felony and racial segregation is still active. Students at Princeton are purely white and the only Black people on campus are manual workers; students feel free to harass them and use slurs.

Steve turns out to be homosexual and in love with Michael, and when he discovers Michael's background, he marvels at his talk of gay pride marches, urban gay communities, and a mass social movement in Michael's world of origin, regarding it as "utopian". Much to his own surprise, Michael reciprocates Steve's feelings.

Michael is apprehended by the authorities, who believe that he is a possible spy—since Britain had been under Nazi rule for nearly half a century, anyone speaking like a Briton is a suspect. Michael learns that the water from the well in Hitler's home town was used to create "Braunau Water", which was the instrument to sterilise the European Jews, wiping them out in one generation. In a cruel twist of fate, the person who perfected the synthesis was Dietrich Bauer. Once more his physicist son, Axel, is wracked with guilt and has developed a Temporal Imager. With Michael and Steve's help, they plan to send a dead rat to poison the well so that it will be pumped clean of the sterilising water. As they begin to do this, they are interrupted by the federal agents who apprehended Michael earlier and they end up shooting Steve, who dies in Michael's arms just as the time alteration occurs.

=== Changing history again ===
Time changes again. Expecting the disorientation, Michael comes to his senses faster now and discovers that almost everything is back to how it was, except that his favourite band, Oily-Moily, never existed (one of the band's members was of Austrian extraction). He gives up his career in academia, figuring he can at least make some money "writing" the songs that he remembers from the previous reality. Finally, Michael is reunited with Steve, who is English in this universe and also remembers the previous reality. Their gay relationship is no longer criminal.

=== Structure of the book ===
Every chapter told by the first-person narrator in the (changing) late 20th century reality is followed by one in the German past. These early such chapters depict Hitler's father, an abusive husband and father and a petty tyrant in his job as a customs inspector; Hitler's mother, a gentle and sensitive woman escaping into fantasy from the harsh reality of her life; the 10-year old Adolf Hitler standing up to his father... Later chapters take place in the trenches of WWI, told from the point of view of Hitler's comrades in arms: ordinary German combat soldiers, completely unaware of the hidden power struggle going on around them between the two potential leaders of the future Nazi Germany—Adolf Hitler and the charismatic officer Rudi Gloder. In one scene, Hitler tricks Gloder into a foolhardy heroic act and getting himself killed; but in the changed history, where Hitler was never born, it is Gloder who tricks another soldier into this act, and gets decorated for recovering his body. Later on, the ruthless Gloder murders a fellow soldier who has discovered his opportunist machinations, followed by the past-war scene where Gloder joins the budding Nazi Party in 1919 Munchen and becomes its star demagogue. The significance of some details in these past scenes only becomes clear much later. For example, there is an early scene where Hitler's mother's vomits when trying to draw water and getting out of the pump a stinking maggot-filled mass; this turns out at the book's end to be the result of the protagonist sending back in time the rotting bodies of dead rats in order to prevent Hitler's father from drinking the sterilizing water.

== Reception ==
Michiko Kakutani of The New York Times found the comic tone of the book "shockingly tasteless" and "deeply offensive" given the subject matter.

Israeli researcher Asaf Ben Vered noted that "The protagonist of Making History gets told that "There are no Jews left in Europe". That result could not have been achieved solely by sterilizing Jewish men through the "Braunau Water". In that case, in the 1990s there should have still been a big number of sad old and middle aged Jews with no progeny, and the Nazis could not have kept them completely hidden from the world. Plus, if only Jewish men were sterilized, at least some Jewish women would have let themselves be impregnated by non-Jewish men; in fact, Jewish religious law specifically stipulates that such children would be considered Jewish. (...) Anyway, why would Gloder do it at all? To be sure, he is an anti-semite, like many Germans of his time. But as seen from his cynically frank wartime diary, he is above all a completely ruthless and totally unprincipled opportunist, for whom German Nationalism and wartime heroism are simply tools to be used or discarded. He needed the Jewish nuclear scientists to develop nuclear bombs by 1938. He still needs them when entering a nuclear arms race with the US. Were the Jewish scientists and their families exempted from deportation to the "Jewish Free State"? Would they go on working for him when all other Jews were deported? (...) The book avoids the real moral dilemma which it could have easily posed and which would have made it a far more profound and thought-provoking work. Suppose the opportunist Gloder had altogether avoided the Final Solution, and contented himself with some anti-Jewish rhetoric. Which world would be worse? Our world – or a world with an entrenched Nazi dictatorship in Europe and a racist and homophobic America, but no gas chambers and ovens, six million Jews able to live out their life, even if under Nazi rule? Putting it this way, the protagonist would have needed at least some serious thinking and inner debate before proceeding as he does in the final chapters."

== See also ==
- Hypothetical Axis victory in World War II

(There are numerous World War II alternative history texts wherein events during the war occurred differently from those in history. The most common variant of these detail the victory and survival of Nazi Germany.)
