= Stephen Fry: The Secret Life of the Manic Depressive =

- Directed by: Ross Wilson
- Starring: Stephen Fry
- No. of episodes: 2

Original release
- Release: 2006

Stephen Fry: The Secret Life of the Manic Depressive is a 2006 two-part television documentary directed by Ross Wilson and featuring British actor and comedian Stephen Fry. It explores the effects of living with bipolar disorder on other celebrities and members of the public. Fry has a less severe version of the illness called cyclothymia. It won the International Emmy Award for Best Documentary at the 35th International Emmy Awards in 2007.

A follow-up documentary, titled The Not So Secret Life of the Manic Depressive: 10 Years On, aired in February 2016.

== Celebrities featured ==
- Andy Behrman
- Jo Brand
- Richard Dreyfuss
- Carrie Fisher
- Griff Rhys Jones
- Tony Slattery
- Rick Stein
- Robbie Williams

The Robbie Williams segment, featured in the original BBC broadcast, was cut from further airings as well as the DVD release, likely due to copyright issues with the musical inserts.

Peter Gabriel was reportedly approached to appear. "After my divorce, I got very depressed and ended up doing three years' therapy with my ex-wife and three years on my own," he stated to Mark Blake. "I believe in being open about this, and that led Stephen to believe that I'm bipolar. To the best of my knowledge, I am not bipolar. I can be a little up and down, but not the same extremes as manic depressives I have known. But I think it's helpful to talk about this, especially for men."

== See also ==
- The 2007 documentary film A Summer in the Cage
