= The Hippopotamus =

1994 novel by Stephen Fry

- First edition (UK)
- Author: Stephen Fry
- Language: English
- Genre: Comedy, mystery
- Published: 1994
- Publisher: Hutchinson (UK); Random House (US)

The Hippopotamus (1994) is a comic novel by Stephen Fry. Written in part as an epistolary novel, it is largely narrated by the main character Edward "Ted" Wallace. Wallace is an alcoholic washed-up poet and theatre critic who, having been fired from his newspaper job, accepts a lucrative commission from his terminally ill goddaughter to investigate rumours of miracle healings at Swafford Hall, country mansion of Wallace's old friend Lord Logan.

== Title ==
The novel's title comes from the poem of the same name by T. S. Eliot, whose first verse is quoted as the epigraph:

The broad-backed hippopotamus
Rests on his belly in the mud;
Although he seems so firm to us
He is merely flesh and blood.

The title draws comparisons between the animal as described in the poem and the main character, Ted Wallace, a slovenly man who enjoys long baths. (Hence cover designs picturing an actual hippopotamus or Fry himself in a bathtub.) The title and epigraph imply as well one of the novel's themes: the practicality of poetry and how that helps Wallace, a poet, regard the "miracles" in the story with a sceptical eye.

== Synopsis ==
The "hippo" of the title (occasionally referred to as "the happy hippo" and given to wallowing in long baths) is Edward (Ted/Tedward) Lennox Wallace, an aging, lecherous, one-time hell-raising poet, reduced by diminishing poetic talent to working as a theatre critic. The story opens with the aftermath of Ted being fired from his job on a newspaper.

At the suggestion of a sick god-daughter, Jane (suffering from leukaemia), he goes to stay at the Norfolk country house of old schoolfriend and Army colleague from National Service, Lord Michael Logan and his wife Lady Anne, to investigate unspecified mysterious goings-on.

Ted reports back to Jane regularly, in the form of long, rambling letters, apprising her of events at Swafford Hall whilst also offering his views on numerous other issues (women, art, poetry, sex, morality and modern life being favourite topics), all the time attempting to uncover the nature of the unusual events that Jane has instructed him to look out for.

Over the course of his stay it gradually becomes apparent that other house guests are ascribing healing powers to one of Logan's children, David (Ted's other godchild), and indeed it is in the hope that he might bestow his 'talent' upon them that they have descended upon Swafford Hall. Among the assembled guests are a witty and hugely camp but rebarbative defrocked minister and TV producer, a businessman and his wife and rather gawky teenage daughter, a friend of Jane's, and Jane's mother, a woman Ted crossed paths with disastrously many years earlier.

The life stories of the tycoon Logan and his family, as well as Ted's own, are intertwined to provide a colourful and credible back story. The story is run through with a stream of sexual practices, some more unusual than others, as Ted uncovers the means by which David delivers his 'healing'.

The story contains several (spoof) poems and limericks.

== Film adaptation ==
A film of The Hippopotamus was shot in 2015 and released in 2017. The film was directed by John Jencks and stars Roger Allam as Ted Wallace and Matthew Modine as Lord Michael Logan. Russell Tovey, Scott Chambers and Rod Glenn also star. The script is by theatre director and writer Blanche McIntyre and Tom Hodgson, writer of Seve, the 2014 biopic of Seve Ballesteros.
