= Moab Is My Washpot =

Autobiography of Stephen Fry

Moab Is My Washpot: An Autobiography
- Author: Stephen Fry
- Language: English
- Genre: Autobiography
- Publisher: Random House
- Publication date: 1997
- Publication place: United Kingdom
- Media type: Print (Hardcover & Paperback); Digital (eBook)
- Pages: 448 pages
- ISBN: 0-09-945704-0
- Followed by: The Fry Chronicles: An Autobiography

Moab Is My Washpot (published 1997) is Stephen Fry's autobiography, covering the first 20 years of his life. In the book, Fry is candid about his past indiscretions, including stealing, cheating, and lying. The book covers some of the same ground as Fry's first novel, The Liar, published in 1991. In that work, public schoolboy Adrian Healey falls in love with a boy called Hugo Cartwright; in the autobiography, 14-year-old Fry becomes besotted with 13-year-old "Matthew Osborne".

Fry also writes about his older brother Roger, Bunce (the new boy at his prep school, Stouts Hill), Jo Wood (his best friend at Uppingham), and Oliver Derwent (a prefect who "seduces" Fry).

== Title ==
The title, never explained in the text of the book, is a verse found in Psalm 60 and Psalm 108. Through wearing sandals, people's feet would become filthy in the dusty desert environment and upon entering a house, they would wash their feet by pouring water over them into a washpot. Moab, which had threatened Israel, was to be so completely subdued that it became likened to a washpot or basin. Fry selected this title because he saw his book as "scrubbing at the grime of years".

== Matthew Osborne ==
In a 2001 article for the Evening Standard, Andrew Billen wrote that Fry was reunited with "Osborne" after the publication of the book:

Many pages of the deepest purple are devoted to this Matthew Osborne, "the most beautiful thing I had ever seen in my life". I ask if the pseudonymous Matthew, with whom he eventually achieved some form of splendour in the long grass, had been in touch since the book came out in 1997. He had.

How did he take it? "Very well. He is very happily married with children. A wonderful chap and hugely successful as it happens," Fry chuckles, incredulous. "I think his wife knows because she is extremely friendly to me in a way that suggests to me she knows all about it and is very happy with it. I see him a couple of times a year, I suppose."
