= Stephen Fry's Incomplete and Utter History of Classical Music =

Stephen Fry's Incomplete and Utter History of Classical Music is a book ghostwritten by Tim Lihoreau for author, actor, comedian and director Stephen Fry.

It is based on Fry's regular Classic FM radio slot and is a book about the history of classical music. Fellow radio host Lihoreau has written a range of Classic FM publications along similar lines.

Fry provided a Foreword in which he states that it is "a very personal book" (p. ix). Although the book is written in the first person, the nature and extent of Fry's contribution is not otherwise explained.
