= Fry's Planet Word =

- Genre: Documentary
- Written by: Stephen Fry
- Directed by: John-Paul Davidson; Helen Williamson
- Presented by: Stephen Fry
- Composers: Debbie Wiseman; Andy Hopkins
- No. of episodes: 5

Production
- Executive producers: Mark Bell; Gina Carter
- Producer: Helen Williamson
- Running time: 60 minutes

Original release
- Network: BBC Two, BBC HD
- Release: 25 September – 23 October 2011

Fry's Planet Word is a documentary series about language. Written and presented by Stephen Fry, five hour-long episodes were first broadcast in September and October 2011 on BBC Two and BBC HD. The series was produced and directed by John-Paul Davidson who worked with Fry on two other documentaries: Stephen Fry in America (2008) and Last Chance to See (2009). There is a book to accompany the series published by Michael Joseph, an imprint of Penguin Group.

== Episodes ==
=== "Babel" ===
Focusing on the origins of language with topics covered including:

- The Max Planck Institute for Evolutionary Anthropology and communication between primates
- The Turkana language
- The FOXP2 gene and its effect on language
- Brain patterns from an MRI scan while talking
- Victor of Aveyron, feral children, and language acquisition (discussion with psycholinguist Steven Pinker)
- The wug test by Jean Berko Gleason
- The Klingon language and how d'Armond Speers taught it as the first language to his son
- Sign language
- The Tower of Babel
- Philology, the Proto-Indo-European language, and Grimm's law
- Working languages and official languages of the United Nations

=== "Identity" ===
Focusing on how one identifies through language

- Regional accents of English through Yorkshire and Newcastle upon Tyne (discussion with poet Ian McMillan)
- Multilingualism
- Jewish humour and the Yiddish language (Discussion with comedians Ari Teman and Stewie Stone at The Friar's Club)
- Language death and globalisation
- Irish language and the Connacht Irish dialect on Ros na Rún
- Basque language and cuisine
- The loss of the Occitan language and its Provençal dialect
- The Académie Française and inventing new French words
- The Maghreb French dialect's effect on standard French
- Israel and the revival of the Hebrew language as a modern language (discussion with linguist Ghil'ad Zuckermann)
- Kenya's Turkana people and the use of English, Swahili, and Turkana

=== "Uses and Abuses" ===
The evolution of slang and profanity

- Common sources of obscenities in the Turkana and English languages
- "Fuck", Tourette syndrome, and coprolalia
- Swearing and the basal ganglia
- Brian Blessed, the Stroop effect, and the hypoalgesic effect of swearing
- The Thick of It and Armando Iannucci
- The ban of Lady Chatterley's Lover
- Stephen K. Amos and racial and sexual epithets
- Euphemisms and weasel words
- Omid Djalili and the Persian politeness of taarof
- Euphemism and dysphemism in the hospital
- Polari in Round the Horne
- Teenagers and slang at Berkeley High School
- Hip hop and popular media on the growth of language
- El Général and the Tunisian revolution

=== "Spreading the Word" ===
The history of written language, from the earliest writing to blogging and tweeting

- The Akha people of Thailand who have no written language
- Cuneiform, the history of bureaucracy, and the Epic of Gilgamesh
- Egyptian hieroglyphs and the Rosetta Stone
- Classical Greece, Homer, the Phoenicians, and the alphabet
- Jerusalem, the Western Wall, and the resilience of Judaism by means of the Hebrew alphabet
- The Dome of the Rock and the spread of the Arabic script with Islam
- The Dead Sea Scrolls and the oldest record of the Ten Commandments
- Printing and its roots in China
- The complexities of Written Chinese with David Tang and Johnson Chang
- The development of pinyin during the Cultural Revolution
- Typography, the development of the book, Geoffrey Chaucer, and the standardisation of the English language
- The democratisation of reading, the Age of Enlightenment, and Denis Diderot's Encyclopédie
- The Bodleian Library and the digitisation of information
- Jimmy Wales and the Wikipedia project
- Social media and the Arab Spring
- Belle de Jour and the lure of blogging
- Hanif Kureishi and the evolution of the book, Robert Coover and electronic literature, and the researchers at the MIT Media Lab

=== "The Power and the Glory" ===
The influence of storytelling and literature on language

- The Turkana people and their rivalry with the Toposa people
- Plot with William Goldman and his Marathon Man
- Homer's Odyssey and Iliad
- James Joyce's Ulysses with David Norris
- J. R. R. Tolkien's The Hobbit and The Lord of the Rings and the works of Stephen King with Peter Jackson
- William Shakespeare and the emphasis on character
- Hamlet with Simon Russell Beale, David Tennant, Brian Blessed, and Mark Rylance
- Shakespeare in French with Guillaume Gallienne of the Comédie-Française and in Mandarin Chinese with David Tang and Johnson Chang
- P. G. Wodehouse with Robert McCrum
- George Orwell's Nineteen Eighty-Four, its Newspeak, and business speak with Ian Hislop
- W. H. Auden's "Funeral Blues", Four Weddings and a Funeral, and Coldplay's "Fix You" with Richard Curtis
- Bob Dylan's music with Christopher Ricks

== International broadcast ==
In Australia, this programme was shown on ABC1 at 9:30pm on Sundays from 11 March 2012.
