= John-Paul Davidson =

John-Paul Davidson is a director, producer and writer for television and film. He was born in London and after attending Bristol University, The University of Malaya and San Francisco Art Institute he went on to work for the BBC for a number of years before becoming a freelance director, specialising in documentary film making.

In 2018 he directed narrative feature film The Thin Man which has since been retitled The Man in the Hat in France alongside Oscar-winning composer Stephen Warbeck starring Ciarán Hinds and Stephen Dillane.

== Filmography ==
- Stephen Fry in Central America (2015) director/producer TV mini series
- Seve - the movie [2014] director movie
- Brazil with Michael Palin (2012) director TV documentary mini series
- Sting's Winter Songbook (2010) TV documentary
- Down By The River with Hugh Laurie (2011), TV documentary
- Fry's Planet Word (2011 Director/Series Producer) TV documentary series
- Last Chance to See (2009 Director) (mini) TV nature series
- Stephen Fry In America (2008 Director/Series Producer) (mini) TV documentary series
- Michael Palin's New Europe (2007 director) (mini) TV documentary series
- Catherine the Great (2005, writer, producer and director) (TV movie)
- Himalaya with Michael Palin (2004, director) (mini) TV documentary series
- Sahara with Michael Palin (2002, director) (mini) TV documentary series
- The Sweatbox (2002, producer and director)movie
- Raging Planet Episode: "Blizzard" (1997, director) TV episode
- The Grotesque (1995, director) movie
- Boys from Brazil (1993, director) TV movie
- Galahad of Everest (1991, director) movie
