= Last Chance to See (TV series) =

2009 British television documentary

- Title card from the "Kakapo" episode
- Genre: Nature documentary
- Presented by: Stephen Fry; Mark Carwardine
- Composers: David Ayers, Felix Tod
- Country of origin: United Kingdom
- Original language: English
- No. of series: 1
- No. of episodes: 6

Production
- Executive producers: Sam Organ, André Singer
- Producer: Tim Green
- Production locations: New Zealand; Brazil; Madagascar; Indonesia; Malaysia; Mexico; Kenya; Uganda
- Running time: 60 minutes
- Production companies: BBC Wales, West Park Pictures

Original release
- Network: BBC Two
- Release: 6 September – 18 October 2009

Last Chance to See is a wildlife documentary first broadcast on BBC Two in the United Kingdom during September and October 2009. The series is a follow-up of the 1989 radio series, also called Last Chance to See, in which Douglas Adams and Mark Carwardine set out to find endangered animals. In this updated television version, produced for the BBC, Stephen Fry and Carwardine revisit the animals originally featured to see how they're getting on almost 20 years later.

In one episode, a male kākāpō, called Sirocco, mounts and attempts to mate with Carwardine's head. Sirocco found fame after the video of his antics became an internet hit, and was later anointed as New Zealand's "spokesbird for conservation".

A Last Chance to See special called "Return of the Rhino" was broadcast on BBC Two on 31 October 2010. The programme followed four of the last remaining northern white rhinos as they were transferred from Dvůr Králové Zoo in the Czech Republic to Ol Pejeta Conservancy, a protected reserve in Kenya, in a last-ditch attempt to save the subspecies from extinction.

== Episodes ==
The main aim of each episode was to seek out an endangered species and to investigate its plight. In addition, a variety of other animals are filmed on location all over the world.

=== 1. Amazonian manatee ===
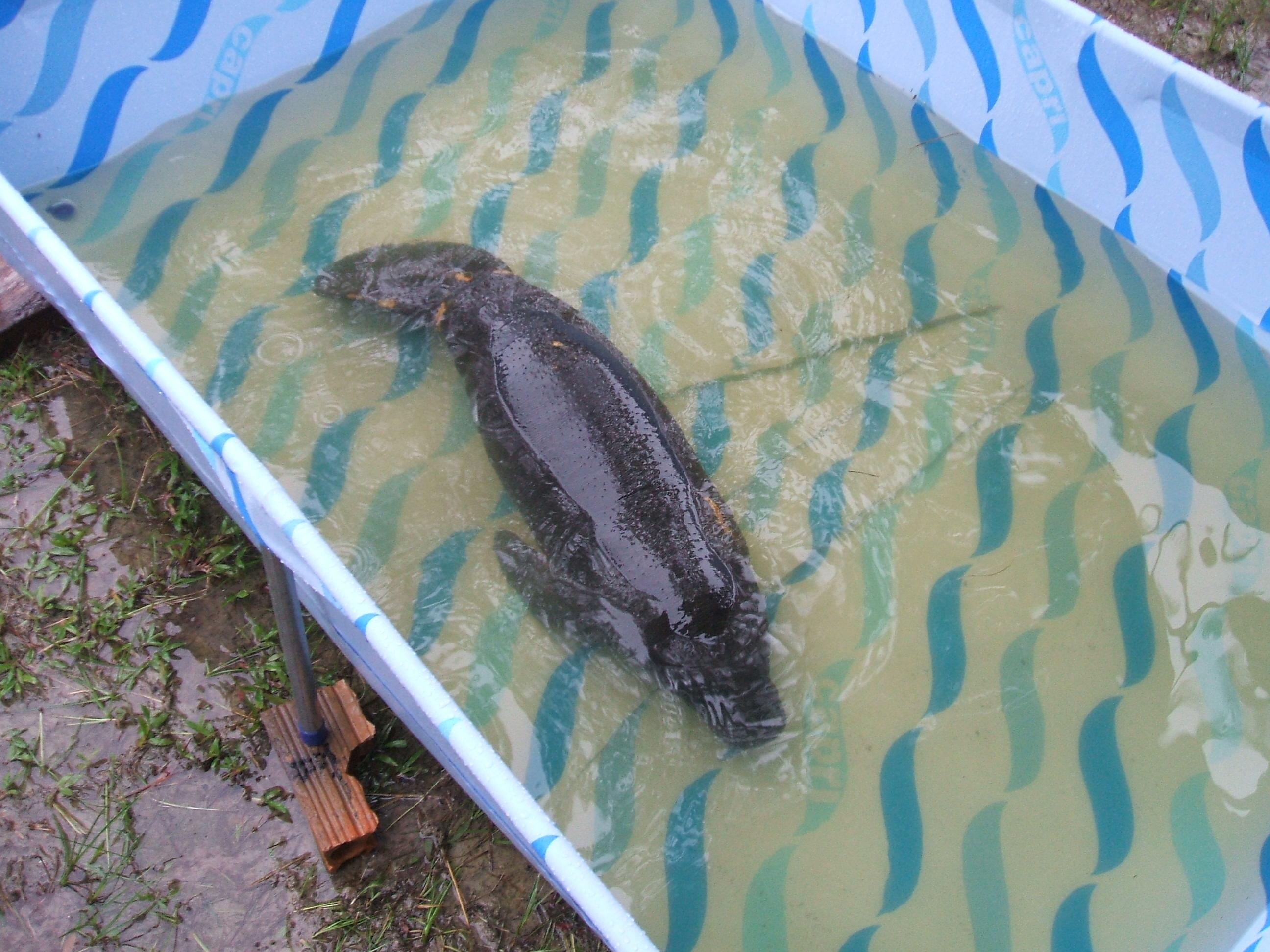
An Amazonian manatee calf at a rehabilitation centre in Brazil

UK broadcast 6 September 2009, 3.31 million viewers (13.2% audience share)

In the opening programme, Fry and Carwardine travel to Manaus in Brazil in search of the Amazonian manatee. Hunting has reduced wild manatee numbers to a few thousand individuals. On the Rio Negro, they have an encounter with a group of endangered botos, which take food from their hands. The two fly deeper into the forest to rendezvous with a boat, the Cassiquiari, on the Rio Aripuanã. Further upriver, they meet scientist Marc van Roosmalen and his team. Manatees are known to live in the vicinity, but despite searching the river and surrounding lakes, they fail to encounter the species in the wild. Carwardine takes Fry to INPA in Manaus, where captive manatees are kept for research. At Tefé, west of Manaus, they plan to join Miriam Rosenthal and her Mamirauá team on a trip to release an injured one-year-old manatee back into the wild. However, on the morning of their departure, Fry trips and breaks his arm in three places. After Fry is evacuated for medical attention, Carwardine reunites with the Mamirauá project. The manatee is transferred to a purpose-built enclosure in a remote river community before full release. By engaging local people, the team hope to foster an enthusiasm for conserving the species.

=== 2. Northern white rhinoceros ===
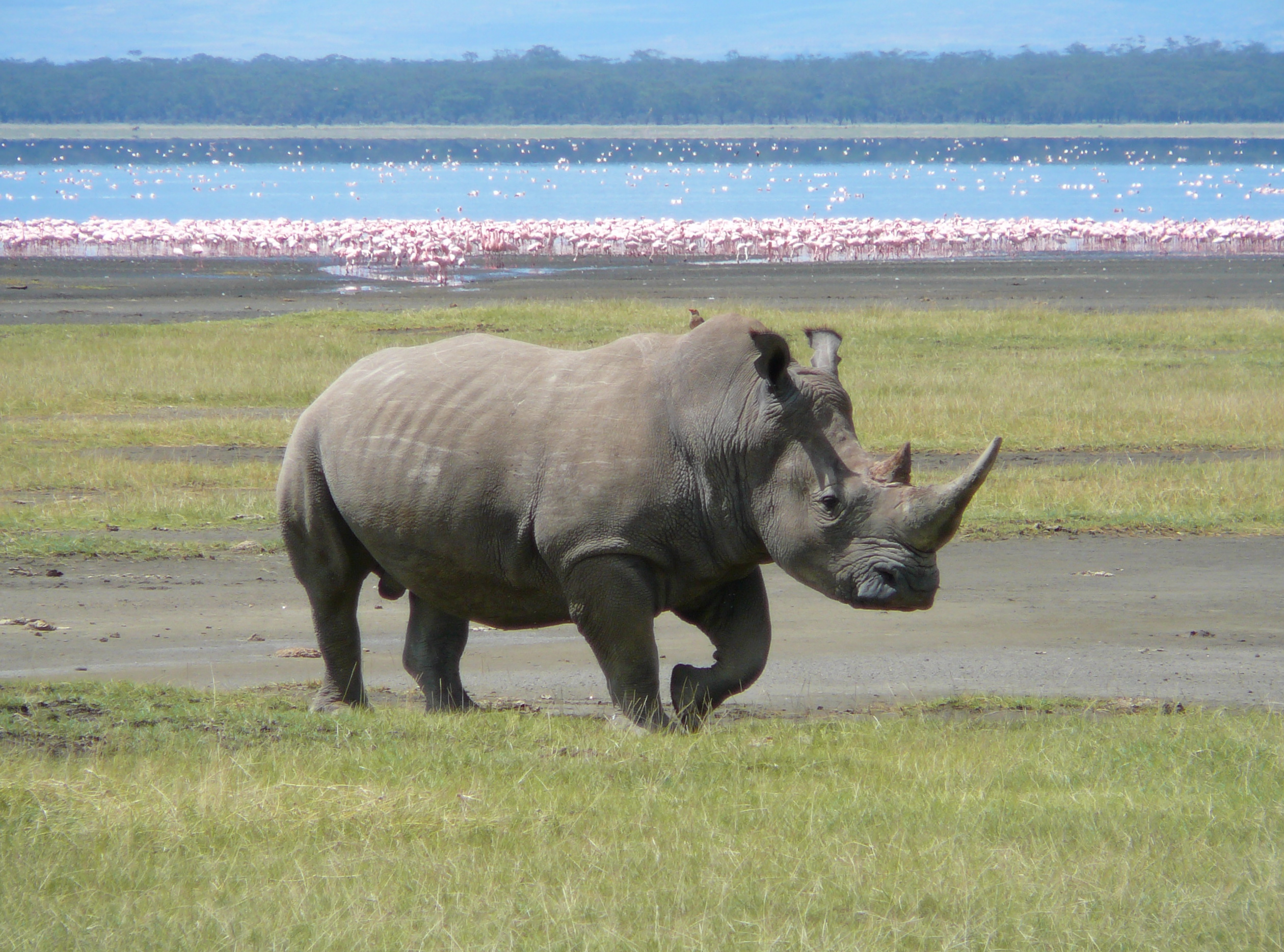
A southern white rhino at Lake Nakuru, Kenya

Broadcast 13 September 2009, 3.28 million viewers (13.2% audience share)

The critically endangered northern subspecies of the white rhinoceros is the focus of the second episode. The only surviving wild population is found in the Democratic Republic of the Congo's Garamba National Park. Carwardine hopes to return to the park where he and Adams managed to find and photograph the animals 20 years ago. The episode opens with an encounter with a wild southern white rhino, which turns out to be a prank by the rangers as the rhino in question is tame, having been hand-reared. In northern Kenya, Fry and Carwardine have a less welcome surprise when they arrive as a conservation project to relocate the northern whites to a protected area is being abandoned. The pair then turn their attention to primates, visiting a chimpanzee rehabilitation centre and tracking mountain gorillas in Uganda's Bwindi Impenetrable Forest. At Queen Elizabeth National Park, close to the border with the DRC, Carwardine is pleased to find that elephant numbers have increased from a handful of animals to over one thousand, showing that anti-poaching patrols are working. At this point, Carwardine, who has been receiving news from contacts though the trip, decides that it is too risky to cross the border, as the eastern DRC is gripped by the Kivu conflict, and the journey to Garamba National Park, where the rhinos were last sighted in 2006 would involve travelling through the fighting. Returning to Kenya, the presenters join a team from the Kenya Wildlife Service on a black rhino relocation project. After a fast and bumpy ride, they find and dart three rhinos, and transport them 100 miles to begin a new population in a fenced conservancy.

This episode was dedicated to sound recordist Jake Drake-Brockman, who was killed in a motorcycle accident on 1 September 2009.

=== 3. Aye-aye ===
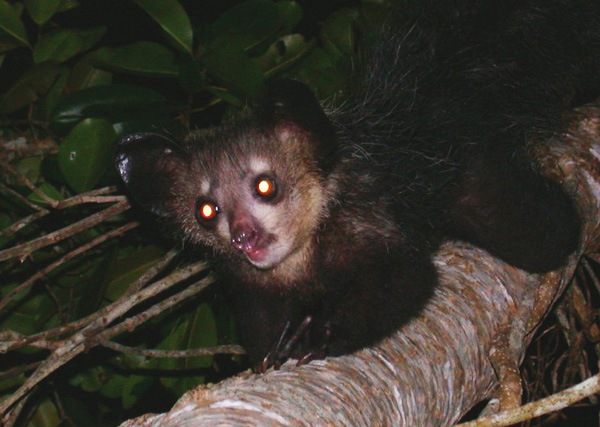
The aye-aye's nocturnal habits make it difficult to see in the wild

Broadcast 20 September 2009, 2.15 million viewers (7.7% audience share)

The third programme is set in Madagascar, where Adams and Carwardine conceived the idea for Last Chance to See on their first travels together in 1985. In Nosy Mangabe, they encountered a wild aye-aye, a rare nocturnal lemur. Carwardine brings Fry to the tree where he saw the creature, but this time they have no luck. The pair embark on a trip through Madagascar to view the island's unique fauna. They encounter brown and ring-tailed lemurs at Berenty Reserve, and the recently discovered Madame Berthe's mouse lemur, the world's smallest primate, in Kirindy Forest. Carwardine is shocked at the disappearance of the island's rainforests since his earlier visit. Timber provides poor communities with fuel and building material—only the unsuitable baobab trees are spared. Slash and burn agriculture and monoculture also contribute to deforestation. Conservationists are battling to preserve the remaining fragmented islands of forest by planting green corridors and engaging local communities. In a Malagasy village, Fry and Carwardine witness a traditional healing ceremony. The aye-aye has been a victim of cultural beliefs as well as habitat loss, regarded by some natives as a symbol of death. When superstitious villagers encounter the animal, they kill it to prevent a death in their community. Despite their misgivings, the presenters are charmed by a captive specimen at Antananarivo Zoo. The quest for a wild aye-aye goes on, and their perseverance is rewarded with a sighting of two animals in the same tree in Mananara Nord National Park.

=== 4. Komodo dragon ===
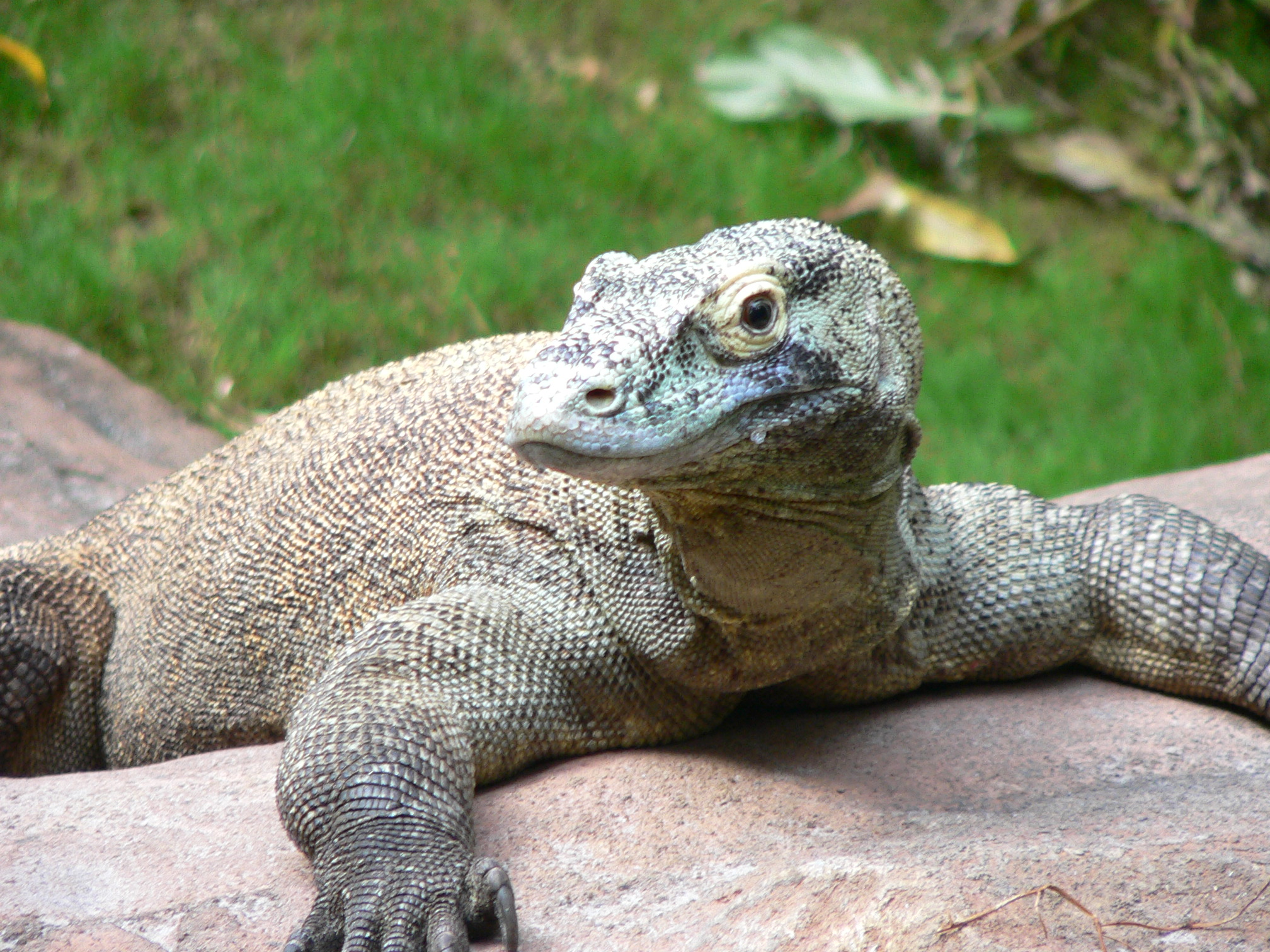
A Komodo dragon, the world's largest lizard

Broadcast 27 September 2009, 2.23 million viewers (7.8% audience share)

Fry and Carwardine travel to Indonesia and Malaysia to out a rare, endemic species. At Snake Island they encounter a venomous yellow-lipped sea krait, causing Fry to rue his decision to wear open-toed sandals. At Turtle Island, conservationists are working to protect sea turtles. The presenters help to collect eggs from a female green turtle that has come ashore to lay, and then release new hatchlings back into the sea. Heading further south, the pair dive and snorkel on Indonesia's coral reefs, viewing adult turtles and seahorses. On Mabul Island they find sharks' fins and jawbones, dried seahorses and sea cucumbers for sale. Carwardine explains that the demand from Asian markets, for food and traditional medicine, is driving these species to extinction. At Labuk Bay they view proboscis monkeys in a mangrove sanctuary surrounded by oil palm plantations. Fry compares their noises to lunchtime at the Garrick Club. Their final destination is the Indonesian island of Rinca, home to the Komodo dragon. The world's largest lizard is not to be underestimated: they meet rangers and villagers who have been attacked by dragons, and hear of a child who was killed. However, the dragons are entwined in the islanders' culture, and the tourists they attract bring much-needed income. Fry and Carwardine help Park rangers to fit a radio collar to a dragon as part of a research project. With protection, tolerance from locals and the ability of female dragons to procreate through parthenogenesis, Fry is confident that the species can survive.

=== 5. Kakapo ===
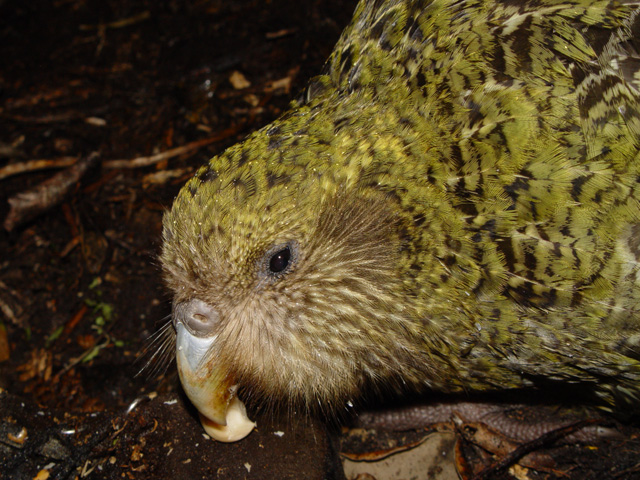
A kākāpō feeding on Codfish Island

Broadcast 4 October 2009, 2.36 million viewers (7.8% audience share)

The penultimate programme opens with aerial scenes of New Zealand's Southern Alps as the presenters fly in by helicopter. This was once the natural habitat of the kākāpō, a critically endangered flightless parrot now confined to two offshore islands. Kākāpō numbers were decimated by predators and Māori hunters, and fewer than 100 remained at the time the episode was filmed. (The population of living Kākāpō is 325 (as of 2026).) Later, they are shown a Māori cloak made from kākāpō feathers in the Te Papa museum in Wellington. On the North Island, they encounter other New Zealand rarities such as the kiwi and giant wētā. They also meet filmmaker Peter Jackson, who confesses to a childhood phobia of wētās. Conservationist Don Merton takes Fry and Carwardine to the Chatham Islands, where the endemic black robin was saved from extinction by eradicating introduced predators. This became the model for kākāpō conservation, and Merton now hopes to reintroduce kākāpō to Sinbad Gully, a remote Fiordland valley. At Invercargill, they enter quarantine before flying to Codfish Island / Whenua Hou where researchers are predicting a record kākāpō breeding season (they are later proved correct, with 34 eggs hatching). They watch a hand-reared male called Sirocco broadcast his nightly booming calls. After days frustrated by bad weather, Carwardine's efforts to take photographs of Sirocco take an unexpected turn. The kākāpō climbs on to his head and attempts to mate with him, much to Fry's amusement. He later gets the privilege of filming a female on her nest. Fry is overwhelmed by the conservation effort dedicated to just one species, describing it as a "story of human passion and commitment".

=== 6. Blue whale ===
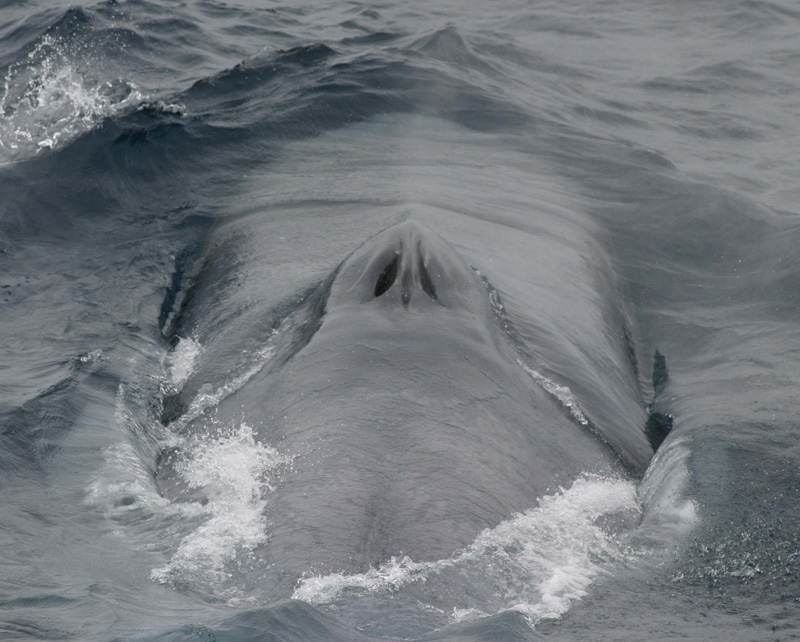
A blue whale surfaces to take a breath

Broadcast 18 October 2009, 3.0 million viewers (10.4% audience share)

The subject of the final programme was due to be the Yangtze river dolphin; however, the species was declared extinct in 2007. Instead, he takes Fry to the Gulf of California on the eastern side of the Baja California Peninsula in Mexico to search for the endangered blue whale. The area is an important breeding ground for many cetaceans, and one they are almost guaranteed to find is the grey whale. In San Ignacio Lagoon, a group approaches so close to their boat that they reach into the water and touch them. They ride mules through the peninsula's desert interior to view rock art painted by the Cochimí, a Pre-Columbian civilisation. Returning to the coast at La Paz, they visit a sea lion colony offshore to collect faeces. Analysis shows they have changed their diet from sardines to bottom-dwelling fish, evidence of overfishing. The presenters then join marine biologists on a research boat, one of whom is Miss Baja California Sur. She and Carwardine dive with a whale shark to take measurements, photos and collect a DNA sample. They spend several days at sea on board the Horizon searching for blue whales. They encounter breaching humpback whales, and learn about one predator benefiting from overfishing of sharks, the voracious Humboldt squid. However, there are no signs of blues, so Carwardine calls in a favour from a local pilot. With the help of the spotter plane, they locate the blue whales.
