= West Park Pictures =

Company

West Park Pictures Logo

West Park Pictures was a company founded in 2007 by UK film maker, Andre Singer who produced many of Werner Herzog's films including the 2006 sci-fi release The Wild Blue Yonder, awarded the Critics Prize at the Venice Film Festival, and in 2009, Herzog's short film featuring an aria of Puccini's La Bohème for Sky Arts. In April 2009, West Park Pictures launched an Irish production subsidiary West Park West in partnership with producer James Mitchell.

== Programmes ==
Notable productions include Stephen Fry in America, the six-part travel series for BBC One, Stephen Fry: HIV and Me for BBC Two (winner of 2008 RTS award for Best Educational Impact in the Primetime Schedule) and Stairway To Heaven, a film made in association with The Prince's Charities for Sky Arts.

- Stephen Fry in America for BBC One (2008)
- The Boys of St. Columb's for RTÉ (2008)
- Theatreland for Sky Arts (2009)
- Last Chance to See for BBC Two (2009)
