= Hypoalgesic effect of swearing =

Pain relief by use of profanity

Research into the hypoalgesic effect of swearing has shown that the use of profanity can help reduce the sensation of pain. This phenomenon is particularly strong in people who do not use such words on a regular basis.

== Effect ==
The effect has been described as being a form of stress-induced analgesia, with swearing due to a painful stimulus being a form of emotional response. However, it is as yet unclear how swearing achieves the physical effects that have been described in the research. Swearing in response to pain may activate the amygdala which in turn triggers a fight-or-flight response. This then leads to a surge in adrenaline, a natural form of pain relief.

== Research ==
Researchers from Keele University conducted a number of initial experiments in 2009 to examine the analgesic properties of swearing. Richard Stephens, John Atkins, and Andrew Kingston published "Swearing as a Response to Pain" in NeuroReport, finding that some people could hold their hands in ice water for twice as long as usual if they swore compared to if they used neutral words. They also reported feeling less pain. Stephens therefore says "I would advise people, if they hurt themselves, to swear".

Further research by Stephens and colleague Claudia Umland was published under the title "Swearing as a Response to Pain – Effect of Daily Swearing Frequency" in The Journal of Pain on 1 December 2011. They showed that subjects who indicated that they swore regularly each day did not demonstrate any or as much improvement in tolerance. Stephens theorises that the emotional attachment that a person has to a swearword affects the results. People who rarely use such words place a higher emotional value on them. In addition to their research Harvard psychologist Steven Pinker wrote in The Stuff of Thought that "humans are hardwired to swear cathartically ... Swearing probably comes from a very primitive reflex that evolved in animals."

The experiments were repeated on television in episodes of MythBusters and Fry's Planet Word, both seeming to confirm the findings. The original research team of Stephens, Atkins, and Kingston were awarded the Ig Nobel Peace Prize in 2010 for their study.

In 2017 researchers from Massey University examined whether verbal swearing would similarly reduce psychological pain. Using a similar method as Stephens and colleagues, Philipp and Lombardo found that people reported an emotionally distressing memory as less painful after swearing.
