= Sirocco (parrot) =

Individual kākāpō (New Zealand flightless parrot)

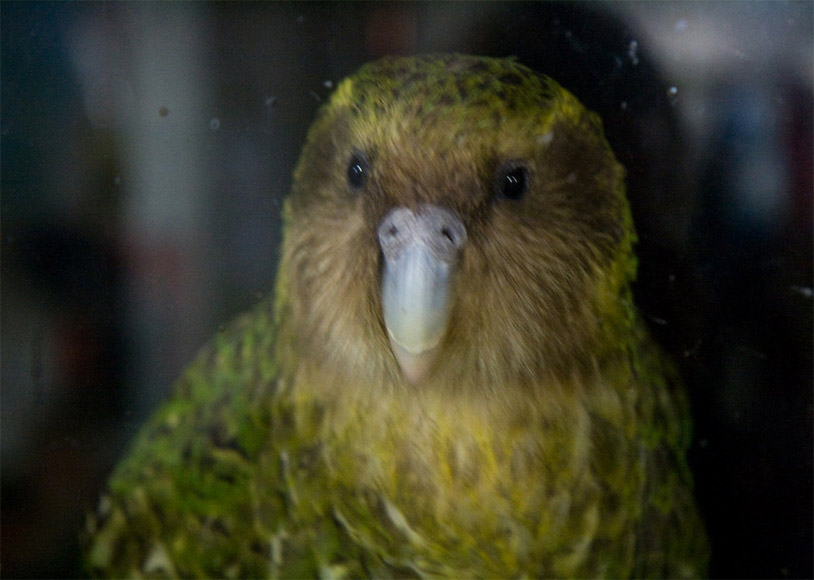
- Sirocco in 2010
- Species: Kākāpō
- Sex: Male
- Hatched: 23 March 1997 (age 29); Codfish Island / Whenua Hou, New Zealand
- Occupation: Official Spokesbird for Conservation
- Known for: Attempting to mate with Mark Carwardine on BBC series Last Chance to See; Ambassador for his species and for conservation
- Parents: Zephyr (mother); Felix (father)
- biography on DoC website

Sirocco (hatched 23 March 1997) is a kākāpō, a large, flightless, nocturnal parrot, and one of the remaining living individuals numbering only 325 (as of 2026). He achieved individual fame following an incident on the BBC television series Last Chance to See in which he attempted to mate with zoologist Mark Carwardine. Subsequent featuring of the incident on television channels around the world and on YouTube resulted in Sirocco becoming internationally known. In his home country of New Zealand, Sirocco has attracted thousands of people during "personal" appearances, and in January 2010 was given the title of Official Spokesbird for Conservation by Prime Minister John Key. In this role, Sirocco helps advocate for conservation through human intermediaries on social media sites and blogs.

== Biography ==
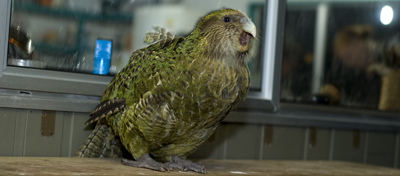
Sirocco guards the hut during the 2008 breeding season.

Sirocco was hatched on 23 March 1997 on the island bird sanctuary of Codfish Island off the west coast of Stewart Island, south of the New Zealand mainland. At three weeks old he suffered a respiratory illness, which led to him being removed from the care of his mother and hand-raised by Department of Conservation rangers.

Having been raised away from other kākāpō, this led to his being imprinted on humans instead of on his mother. As an older bird, he still would not associate with other kākāpō. This extends to the mating ritual of 'booming': Sirocco booms in the presence of humans, rather than female kākāpō. Sirocco is therefore seen as unlikely to be successful at breeding. However, his affinity to human beings means he has become an effective advocate for the kākāpō species.

As Codfish Island, a protected sanctuary, is closed to the public, Sirocco spends much time travelling away from his home. Since 2006 he has regularly appeared on Ulva Island as part of a 'kākāpō encounter'; in September 2009 he travelled to Auckland Zoo, where he was visited by thousands of people. Sirocco appeared at Zealandia wildlife sanctuary in October 2011 and at Maungatautari Ecological Island in 2012. In 2015, he visited Zealandia again for another six-week residence.

Sirocco's radio transmitter went offline in late 2016 or early 2017. For months the team of scientists tasked with routine health checks conducted periodic searches for him using trained English Setters. They issued a public statement that Sirocco's whereabouts were unknown on 23 March 2017, his 20th "hatchday". On 8 February 2018, a release from the Department of Conservation announced that Sirocco has been found alive and fitted with a new transmitter.

Sirocco's preference for head-mating and resistance to massage techniques has made it difficult to collect his semen. Scientists who work with him designed an "ejaculation helmet" for volunteers to wear while he attempted to mate with their heads. The dimpled, rubber headgear was ineffective due to the duration of the kākāpō's mating period and was later donated to the Te Papa museum in Wellington.

== Last Chance to See incident ==
In 2009, zoologist Mark Carwardine and television presenter Stephen Fry visited Codfish Island as part of the TV series Last Chance to See, focusing on endangered species around the world. While they were filming Sirocco, the bird hopped onto Carwardine's head and attempted to mate with him. The scene itself and Fry's commentary, "Sorry, but this is one of the funniest things I've ever seen. You are being shagged by a rare parrot. He thinks you are a female.", proved an instant television hit, being featured on news broadcasts around the world.

A video of the incident was uploaded to YouTube, where it received more than 700,000 views in the first week; as of October 2026, the clip had been viewed over 30 million times. Sirocco's Facebook page and Twitter account, set up after the screening, instantly attracted thousands of followers.

== Other media appearances ==
"Party Parrot", an Internet meme inspired by Sirocco

Indian wildlife filmmaker Ashwika Kapur's short "rags-to-riches" documentary Sirocco – How a Dud Became a Stud is based on his life and won the Wildscreen Panda Award in 2014.

Sirocco became the inspiration for the party parrot, a popular animated emoji frequently associated with the workflow application Slack.

== Spokesbird ==
Sirocco's fame, and awareness that the television incident had massively raised the profile of kākāpō around the world, led to an unusual government appointment for the bird in January 2010.

New Zealand Prime Minister John Key appointed Sirocco as Official Spokesbird for Conservation, to coincide with 2010 being the International Year of Biodiversity. Key commented "He's a very media savvy bird, he's got a worldwide fan base – they hang on every squawk that comes out of his beak. He'll be a great official spokesbird and a great ambassador for New Zealand."

While tongue-in-cheek, the appointment showed awareness of the ability of Sirocco, through his television and social network presence, to attract and engage with people around the world, thus highlighting the plight of the still critically endangered kākāpō.

== See also ==
- List of individual birds
