= Mark Carwardine =

British zoologist

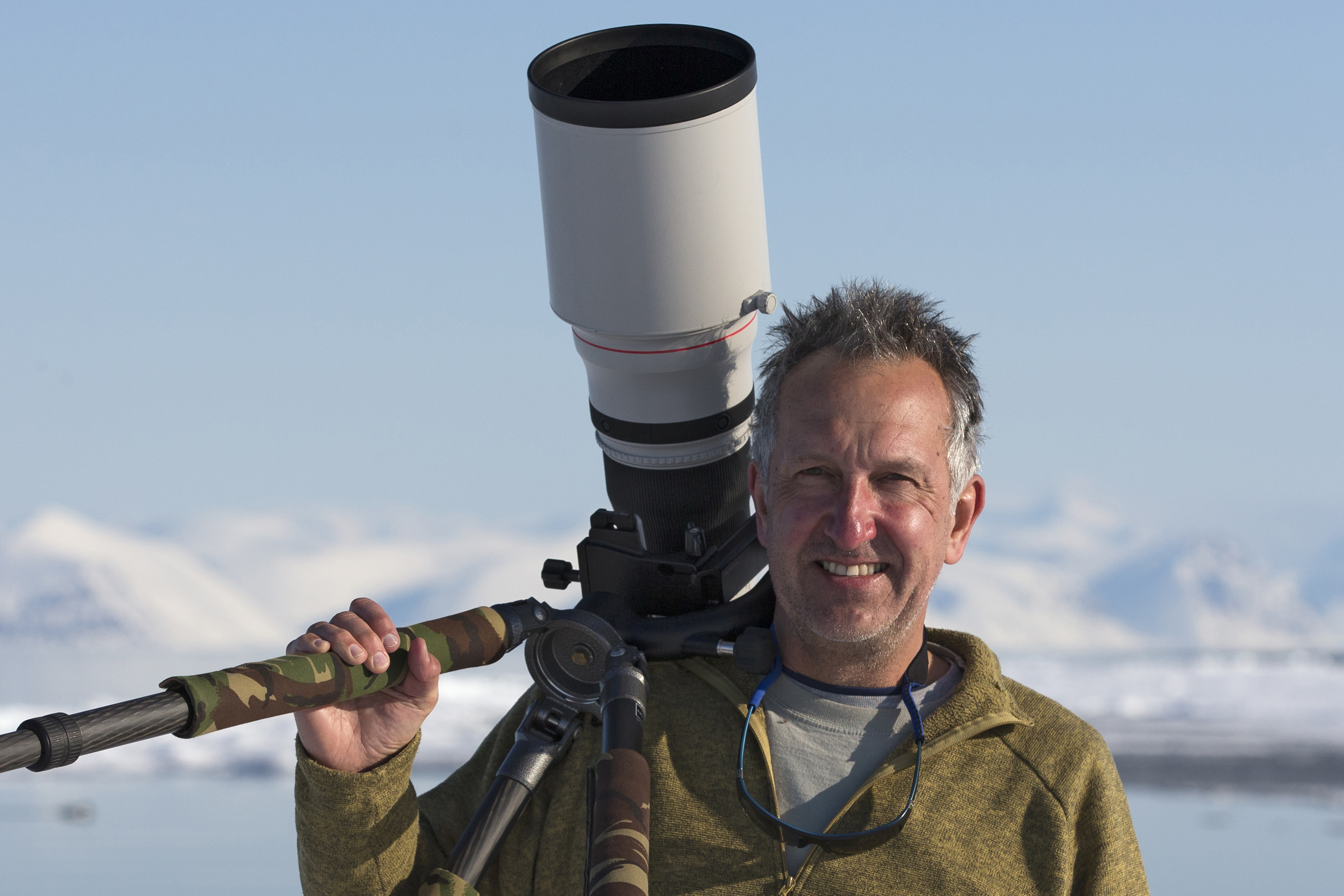
- Born: 9 March 1959 (age 67)
- Known for: Conservationist, zoologist, presenter, photographer and author
- Website: www.markcarwardine.com

Mark Carwardine (IPA: /kɑː'wɔːdiːn/ car-WOR-dean; born 9 March 1959) is a British conservationist, photographer, author and wildlife tour guide. He is best known for his work on Last Chance to See – which involved two round-the-world expeditions with Douglas Adams and Stephen Fry to see endangered animals. The first series was aired on BBC Radio 4 in 1990, and the second, a TV series, on BBC2 in 2009. There are two books about the project: Last Chance to See, which he co-wrote with Adams (1990), and Last Chance to See: In the footsteps of Douglas Adams (2009). He is a conservationist, and a prolific broadcaster, columnist and photographer.

== Writing ==
Carwardine has written more than fifty books. He wrote the Field Guide to Whales, Dolphins and Porpoises (Bloomsbury 2022). In 2009, he wrote Last Chance to See: In the Footsteps of Douglas Adams (HarperCollins). This is a sequel to the best-selling book, Last Chance to See, which he wrote with the late Douglas Adams (author of The Hitchhiker's Guide to the Galaxy). A new edition was published in 2020 to celebrate its thirtieth anniversary. Other books that Carwardine has written include Field Guide to Whales, Dolphins and Porpoises in North America (Bloomsbury 2026), RSPB How to Photograph Garden Birds (Bloomsbury 2023), Handbook of Whales, Dolphins and Porpoises (Bloomsbury 2019) Mark Carwardine's Guide to Whale Watching in North America (Bloomsbury, 2017), Mark Carwardine's Guide to Whale Watching in Britain and Europe (Bloomsbury, 2016), the award-winning Shark Watcher's Handbook and Eyewitness Handbooks: Whales, Dolphins and Porpoises. Carwardine also writes a monthly column in BBC Wildlife magazine, and has written hundreds of articles for newspapers and magazines.

== Radio and television ==
In 1989 the BBC Radio 4 series Last Chance to See and the subsequent book (1990) described eight expeditions by Carwardine and writer Douglas Adams to find and report on some of the most endangered species around the world. These were the aye-aye in Madagascar, the Komodo dragon in Indonesia, the kākāpō in New Zealand, the Amazonian manatee in Brazil, the Yangtze river dolphin in China, the Juan Fernández fur seal in Chile, the northern white rhino in the Democratic Republic of the Congo, and the Rodrigues fruit bat in Mauritius.

Carwardine also presented the weekly half-hour radio programme Nature, on BBC Radio 4, for many years. He has also been the presenter of many other programmes for BBC Radio 4.

In autumn 2009, he joined forces with Stephen Fry to present a follow-up to the original Last Chance to See with the late Douglas Adams. This was the six-part BBC2 television series, also called Last Chance to See, which concerned the very same endangered species as in the original and how they have fared 20 years on. The series not only updated the situation with most of the endangered species featured in the original series but looked at some new ones, including the blue whale in Baja California, Mexico.

In spring 2010, he co-presented The Museum of Life (BBC2, 6 episodes), which explored the pioneering and often surprising research work and wildlife collections of the Natural History Museum, in London.

On BBC2 in October 2010 there was an additional Last Chance to See special by Carwardine and Fry about the northern white rhino, Last Chance to See: Return of the Rhino, which followed the re-introduction of zoo-raised rhinos into the wild.

Also on BBC2 on 7 November 2010 Carwardine and Fry co-presented Stephen Fry and the Great American Oil Spill about the effects, four months after the BP oil disaster in the Gulf of Mexico.

== Photography ==
Carwardine has an extensive collection of wildlife, nature and environment photographs taken on all seven continents and in more than a hundred countries. He wrote two eBooks in 2020 (Wildlife Photography Masterclass: Digital Workflow and Wildlife Photography Masterclass: Camera Settings). He was also chairman of the judging panel for Wildlife Photographer of the Year competition for seven years since 2005, run by the Natural History Museum and BBC Wildlife.

== Wildlife tours ==
Carwardine was a founding director of the wildlife travel company Discover the World. He now runs wildlife trips (mostly whale-watching tours and wildlife photography trips).

== Last Chance to See kākāpō incident ==
In 2009, Carwardine and television presenter Stephen Fry visited Codfish Island in New Zealand as part of a series for the Last Chance to See, focusing on endangered species around the world. While they were filming a kākāpō male called Sirocco, the bird hopped onto Carwardine's head and attempted to mate with him. The scene itself and Fry's commentary, "Sorry, but this is one of the funniest things I've ever seen. You are being shagged by a rare parrot", proved an instant television hit, being featured on news items around the world.

A video of the incident was uploaded to YouTube, where it received more than 700,000 views in the first week. As of August 2024 it has been viewed more than 27 million times.

== Selected bibliography ==
Carwardine has written more than 50 books, including the following:

- Field Guide to Whales, Dolphins and Porpoises in North America (Bloomsbury 2026) ISBN 978-1-3994-2441-7
- RSPB How to Photograph Garden Birds (Bloomsbury 2023) ISBN 978-1-3994-0454-9
- Field Guide to Whales, Dolphins and Porpoises (Bloomsbury 2022) ISBN 978-1-4729-6997-2
- Wildlife Photography Masterclass: Digital Workflow (eBook, self-published 2020)
- Handbook of Whales, Dolphins and Porpoises (Bloomsbury 2020) ISBN 978-1-4729-0814-8
- Mark Carwardine's Guide to Whale Watching in North America (Bloomsbury 2017) ISBN 978-1-4729-3069-9
- Mark Carwardine's Guide to Whale Watching in Britain and Europe second edition (Bloomsbury 2016) ISBN 978-1-4729-1015-8
- Mark Carwardine's Ultimate Wildlife Experiences, with foreword by Stephen Fry (Wanderlust Publications, 2011) ISBN 978-0-9540926-6-5
- Last Chance to See, with Douglas Adams first published 1990 by William Heinemann (Arrow Books, 2009, 2nd edition, 2020 3rd edition) ISBN 978-0-09-953679-6
- Last Chance to See: In the footsteps of Douglas Adams, with foreword by Stephen Fry (HarperCollins, 2009) ISBN 978-0-00-729072-7
- Natural History Museum Animal Records (Natural History Museum, 2007) ISBN 978-0-565-09223-8
- Collins Wild Guide: Whales & Dolphins (HarperCollins, 2006) ISBN 0-00-720547-3
- Extreme Nature, with Rosamund Kidman Cox (HarperCollins, 2005) ISBN 978-0-00-724648-9
- Shark (BBC Books, 2004) ISBN 0-563-48723-2
- Mark Carwardine's Guide to Whalewatching: Britain and Europe (New Holland Publishers, 2003) ISBN 1-84330-059-1
- The Shark Watcher's Handbook: A guide to sharks and where to see them, with Ken Watterson (BBC Books, 2002) ISBN 0-563-53794-9
- Killer Whales (BBC Books, 2001) ISBN 0-563-53407-9
- The Guinness Book of Animal Records (Guinness Publishing, 1995) ISBN 0-85112-658-8
- Eyewitness Handbooks: Whales, Dolphins and Porpoises (Dorling Kindersley, 1995) ISBN 0-7513-1030-1
- On the Trail of the Whale with foreword by Paul McCartney (Thunder Bay Publishing Co, 1994) ISBN 1-899074-00-7
- Last Chance to See, with Douglas Adams (Pan Books, 1991) ISBN 0-330-32002-5
- Birds in Focus (Salamander, 1990) ISBN 0-86101-544-4
- The Encyclopedia of World Wildlife with foreword by David Attenborough (Octopus Publishing, 1986) ISBN 0-7064-2437-9
- The Nature of Zimbabwe: A guide to conservation and development issues (IUCN,1988) ISBN 2-88032-933-7
- The Nature of Zambia: A guide to conservation and development issues (IUCN, 1988) ISBN 2-88032-403-3
- The Nature of Pakistan: A guide to conservation and development issues (IUCN,1986) ISBN 2-88032-404-1
- Iceland: Nature's Meeting Place, with foreword by the President of Iceland (Iceland Review, 1986) ISBN 0-948192-02-X
