= Thomas Chaseland =

Indigenous Australian sealer, whaler, and mariner (c. 1800–1869)

- Born: c.1800 New South Wales, Australia
- Died: 5 June 1869; New Zealand
- Other names: Tame Titirene
- Occupation(s): mariner, whaler and sealer

Thomas Chaseland (c.1800 – 5 June 1869), more commonly known as Tommy Chaseland or Tame Titirene, was an Indigenous Australian sealer, whaler and mariner. For most of his working career, he was based around the southern part of the South Island of New Zealand and is regarded as one of the greatest whalers of that region.

== Early life ==
He was born in Australia on c.1800. His father, Thomas Chaseland senior, was a Londoner who arrived in Australia as a convict in 1792. Chaseland senior married fellow prisoner Margaret McMahon and the couple had six children. Chaseland fathered another child with an Aboriginal woman around 1800. The infant was named Thomas and was born around the time Chaseland senior married and he was raised in the family home with his other children at Windsor in the Hawkesbury River region.

Around this time, the Chaselands were involved in frontier conflict with the local Aboriginal people. After successfully burning down some neighbouring houses, an Indigenous teenage girl attempted to set alight the Chaseland house before being killed. It has been suggested that this girl could have been a relative of the young Chaseland boy, possibly even his mother.

== Entry into seafaring ==
Thomas Chaseland junior went to work as a teenager at the shipyards on the nearby Hawkesbury River. In August 1817, he joined the crew of the Jupiter on a sealing voyage to the islands of Bass Strait. He next served on the King George on a cruise to the Marquesas Islands for a cargo of pork and sandalwood in 1818. He is next recorded aboard the Governor Macquarie in 1819 bound for New Zealand and Tahiti for seal skins and sandalwood. The vessel later spent time at Kangaroo Island taking aboard a cargo of kangaroo and seal skins.

In June 1822, Chaseland joined the St Michael on several whaling voyages to Tonga and other Pacific islands. He impressed the captain of this vessel and was promoted to second mate.

== New Zealand ==
In 1824, Chaseland joined a sealing vessel headed for New Zealand. Upon arrival, he requested a discharge from the ship and at Rakiura, also known as Stewart Island. He became knowledgeable in the Maori language and partnered with a Maori woman named Puna, who was the daughter of a prominent chief named Koroko. He established a residence with Puna at Codfish Island. From this base, Chaseland worked as a whaler, sealer, whaling station manager and maritime pilot.

Chaseland was shipwrecked several times and, on one of these occasions, had to navigate a small open boat many miles back to land. On another occasion, Chaseland's wife Puna helped carry him to safety after a vessel they were on foundered on rocks.

He was also involved in various skirmishes with Maori clans and is presumed to have taken part in a massacre of local villagers near Milford Sound.

In the 1830s, Chaseland and Puna moved to the fjordlands of south-western South Island, where Chaseland became manager of the Preservation Inlet whaling station. By 1848, he had managed several other whaling stations in the area. In the 1850s, he became a maritime pilot in the region.

In 1850, Puna died and Chaseland married a young Maori woman named Pakawhatu, with whom he had four children.

== Death ==
Chaseland died at Stewart Island on 5 June 1869.

== See also ==
- List of Indigenous Australian historical figures
