= Last Chance to See =

BBC radio documentary series

- The front cover of the first US hardcover edition.
- Author: Douglas Adams and Mark Carwardine
- Publisher: Pan Books
- Publication date: 1990
- ISBN: 978-0-345-37198-0
- OCLC: 26948233

Last Chance to See is a 1989 BBC radio documentary series and its accompanying book, written and presented by Douglas Adams and Mark Carwardine. In the series, Adams and Carwardine travel to various locations in the hope of encountering species on the brink of extinction. The book was published in 1990.

In 2009, the BBC broadcast a television follow-up series of the same name, with Stephen Fry replacing the late Adams.

In 1985, Douglas Adams went to Madagascar in search of the (possibly extinct) lemur the aye-aye. The trip was part of a project by the World Wide Fund for Nature and British Sunday newspaper The Observer, sending well-known authors to remote places to seek endangered species and write articles for The Observer Magazine, to help raise awareness of ecological issues. Adams was met in Madagascar by zoologist Mark Carwardine (who was working for the WWF at the time). The Observer project was successful, and Adams and Carwardine developed a radio series around the same concept for BBC Radio 4. Carwardine later said:

"We put a big map of the world on a wall, Douglas stuck a pin in everywhere he fancied going, I stuck a pin in where all the endangered animals were, and we made a journey out of every place that had two pins."

The journeys undertaken were to see:

- The aye-aye in Madagascar
- The Komodo dragon on the island of Komodo in Indonesia
- The kākāpō in New Zealand
- The mountain gorilla in Zaire
- The northern white rhinoceros in Zaire
- The Yangtze river dolphin in China
- The Rodrigues fruit bat on the island of Rodrigues, Mauritius
- The Amazonian manatee in Brazil
- The Juan Fernández fur seal on the Juan Fernández Islands, Chile

== Radio ==
Last Chance to See
- Genre: Wildlife documentary
- Country of origin: United Kingdom
- Language: English
- Home station: BBC Radio 4
- Starring: Douglas Adams and Mark Carwardine
- Original release: October 1989 – November 1989
- Website: BBC Radio

The aye-aye programme was broadcast on BBC Radio 4 on 1 November 1985 as a pilot; six further episodes were then broadcast in 1989:

- The kākāpō - 4 October
- The Yangtze river dolphin - 11 October
- The Amazonian manatee - 18 October
- The Rodrigues fruit bat - 25 October
- The Komodo dragon - 1 November
- The Juan Fernández fur seal - 8 November

The mountain gorilla and northern white rhino, although the subject of chapters in the book, did not appear in the radio series.

The series also features short descriptive pieces narrated by Peter Jones, written and performed in the same style as Jones's role as The Book in the radio series of The Hitchhiker's Guide to the Galaxy.

== Book ==
In 1990, an accompanying book was published in the UK, describing the various adventures that duo had encountered on journeys, often with a comic tone. The book covers most of the radio episodes, but excludes the Juan Fernández fur seal and the Amazonia manatee. It includes some colour photographs taken by Carwardine.

The first American hardcover edition was published by Harmony Books in 1991 (under ISBN 0-517-58215-5) and the first German paperback edition was published in 1992 by Heyne (under ISBN 3-453-06115-2). These editions carry slightly different photographs of the journeys. An abridged audiobook, read by Adams, was also published.

In the posthumous biography and essay collection, The Salmon of Doubt, Adams describes Last Chance to See as his favourite work.

== CD-ROM ==
The front cover of the CD-ROM box set edition of Last Chance to See for computers running Windows 3.1 or later.

The Voyager Company also published a two CD-ROM set (for Microsoft Windows 3.1 and Macintosh System 6), in 1992, featuring over 800 still photographs, Adams reading the nearly complete book, Carwardine reading fact files on the species they searched - like side bars, and extracts from the BBC Radio 4 series.

== Television series ==
In 2009, the BBC broadcast a television follow-up series, in which Stephen Fry, a friend of the late Adams, accompanies Carwardine on a journey to see what has changed in the 20 years since the radio broadcasts. The series excludes the Rodrigues fruit bat, the Yangtze river dolphin, which is "in all probability extinct", and the Juan Fernandez fur seal, which had proved embarrassingly easy for Adams and Carwardine to find.
