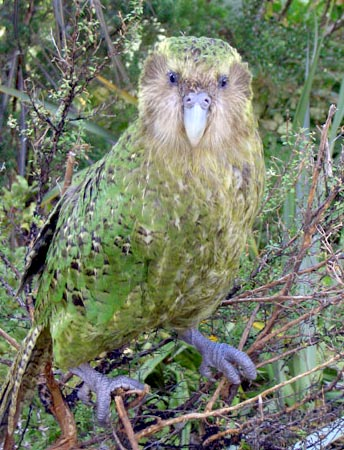
- Celebrity kākāpō and official spokesbird for conservation Sirocco on Maud Island

Conservation status
- Critically Endangered (IUCN 3.1)

- Nationally Critical (NZ TCS)

Scientific classification
- Kingdom: Animalia
- Phylum: Chordata
- Class: Aves
- Order: Psittaciformes
- Superfamily: Strigopoidea
- Family: Strigopidae
- Genus: Strigops
- Species: S. habroptilus

Binomial name
- Strigops habroptilus G.R. Gray, 1845

Audio
- Adult male 'chinging' to attract females

= Kākāpō =

Parrot endemic to New Zealand

The kākāpō (Māori: [ˈkaːkaːpɔː]; pl.: kākāpō; Strigops habroptilus), sometimes known as the owl-parrot, is a species of large, nocturnal, ground-dwelling parrot of the superfamily Strigopoidea. It is endemic to New Zealand.

Kākāpō can be up to 64 cm (25 in) long. They have a combination of unique traits among parrots: finely blotched yellow–green plumage, a distinct facial disc, owl-like forward-facing eyes with surrounding discs of specially textured feathers, a large grey beak, short legs, large blue feet, relatively short wings and a short tail. It is the world's only flightless parrot, the world's heaviest parrot, and also is nocturnal, herbivorous, visibly sexually dimorphic in body size, has a low basal metabolic rate, and does not have male parental care. It is the only parrot to have a polygynous lek breeding system. It is also possibly one of the world's longest-living birds, with a reported lifespan of up to 100 years. Adult males weigh around 1.5–3 kilograms (3.3–6.6 lb); the equivalent figure for females is 0.950–1.6 kilograms (2.09–3.53 lb).

The anatomy of the kākāpō typifies the tendency of bird evolution on oceanic islands. With few predators and abundant food, kākāpō exhibit island syndrome development, having a generally robust torso physique at the expense of flight abilities, resulting in reduced shoulder and wing muscles, along with a diminished keel on the sternum. Like many other New Zealand bird species, the kākāpō was historically important to Māori, the indigenous people of New Zealand. It appears in Māori mythology. Largely hunted in the past, it was used by the Māori both for its red meat and for its feathers.

The kākāpō is critically endangered; the total known population of living individuals is 325 (as of 2026). Known individuals are named, tagged and confined to four small New Zealand islands, all of which are clear of predators; however, in 2023, a reintroduction to mainland New Zealand (Sanctuary Mountain Maungatautari) was accomplished. Introduced mammalian predators, such as cats, rats, ferrets, and stoats almost wiped out the kākāpō. All conservation efforts were unsuccessful until the Kākāpō Recovery Programme began in 1995.

== Taxonomy ==
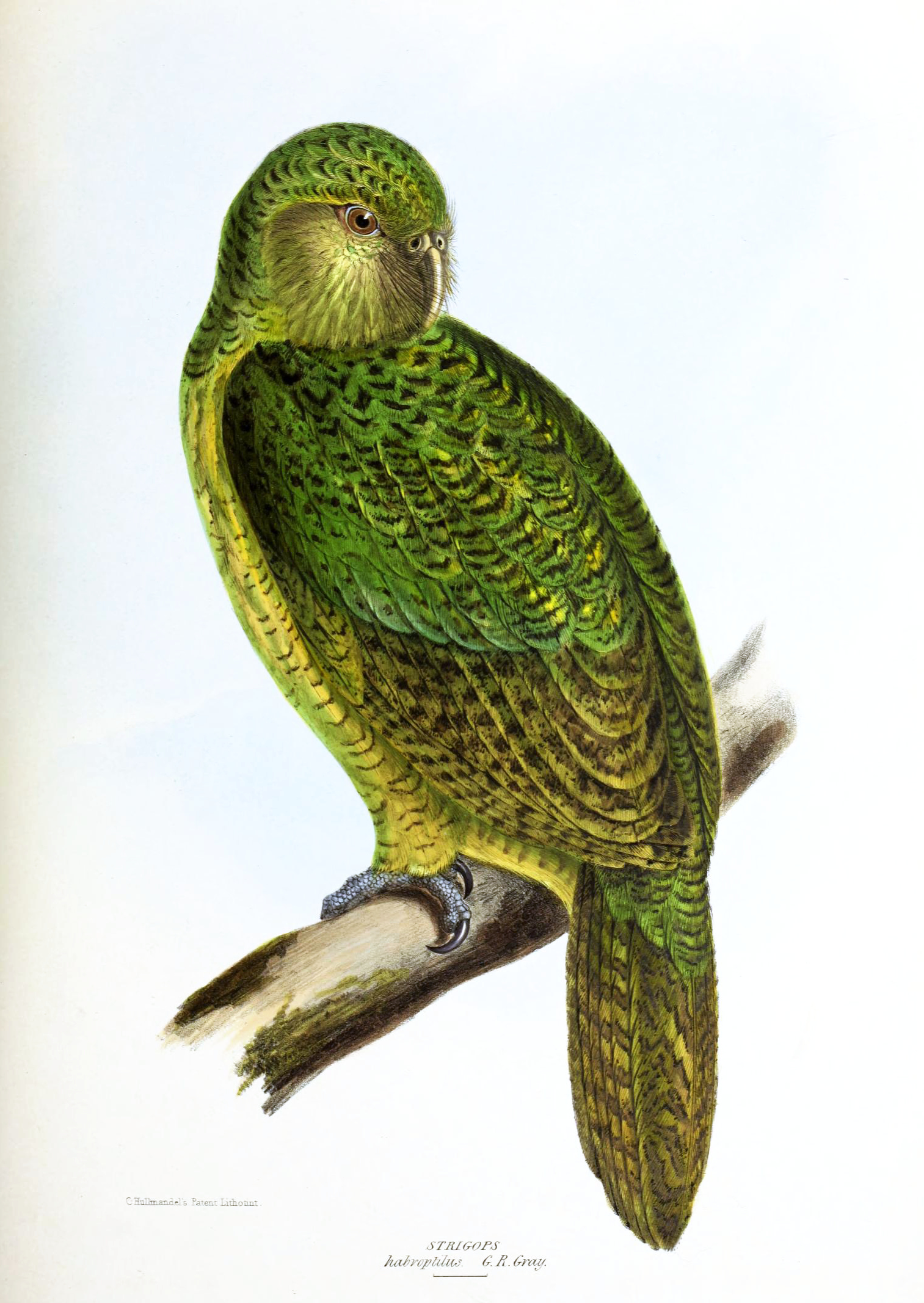
Lithograph by David Mitchell that accompanied Gray's original 1845 description

The kākāpō was formally described and illustrated in 1845 by the English ornithologist George Robert Gray. He created a new genus and coined the binomial name Strigops habroptilus. Gray was uncertain about the origin of his specimen and wrote, "This remarkable bird is found in one of the islands of the South Pacific Ocean." The type location has been designated as Dusky Sound on the southwest corner of New Zealand's South Island. The generic name Strigops is derived from the Ancient Greek strix, genitive strigos ("owl"), and ops ("face"), while its specific epithet habroptilus comes from habros ("soft"), and ptilon ("feather").

In 1955 the International Commission on Zoological Nomenclature (ICZN) ruled that the genus name Strigops was feminine. Based on this ruling many ornithologists used the form Strigops habroptila but in 2023 James L. Savage and Andrew Digby argued that under the current ICZN rules the specific epithet should be habroptilus. This view was accepted by ornithologists and in 2024 the International Ornithological Congress Checklist and the eBird/Clements Checklist changed the spelling of the binomial name back to Strigops habroptilus. The species is monotypic, as no subspecies are recognised.

The name kākāpō is Māori, from kākā ("parrot") + pō ("night"); the name is both singular and plural. "Kākāpō" is increasingly written in New Zealand English with the macrons that indicate long vowels. The correct pronunciation in Māori is [kaːkaːpɔː]; other colloquial pronunciations exist, however. These include the British English /ˈkɑːkəpoʊ/ (KAH-kə-poh), as defined in the Chambers Dictionary in 2003.

The kākāpō is placed in the family Strigopidae together with the two species in the genus Nestor, the kea (Nestor notabilis) and the kākā (Nestor meridionalis). The birds are endemic to New Zealand. Molecular phylogenetic studies have shown that the family Strigopidae is basal to the other three parrot families in the order Psittaciformes and diverged from them 33–44 million years ago. The common ancestor of the kākāpō and the two Nestor species diverged 27–40 million years ago.

Earlier ornithologists felt that the kākāpō might be related to the ground parrots and night parrot of Australia due to their similar colouration, but this is contradicted by molecular studies; rather, the cryptic colour seems to be adaptation to terrestrial habits that evolved twice convergently.

== Description ==
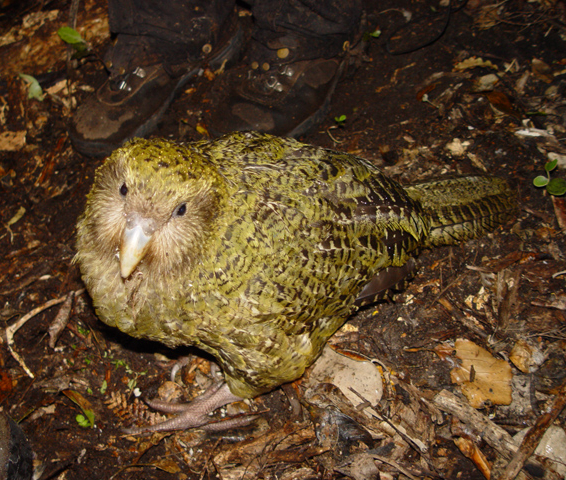
A year-old kākāpō on Codfish Island / Whenua Hou.

The kākāpō is a large, rotund parrot. Adults can measure from 58 to 64 cm (23 to 25 in) in length with a wingspan of 82 cm (32 in). Males are significantly heavier than females with an average weight of 2 kg (4.4 lb) compared with just 1.5 kg (3.3 lb) for females. Kākāpō are the heaviest living species of parrot and on average weigh about 400 g (14 oz) more than the largest flying parrot, the hyacinth macaw.

The kākāpō cannot fly, having relatively short wings for its size and lacking the keel on the sternum (breastbone), where the flight muscles of other birds attach. It uses its wings for balance and to break its fall when leaping from trees. Lighter females are able to perform short glides across gaps in the canopy. Unlike many other land birds, the kākāpō can accumulate large amounts of body fat.

The upper parts of the kākāpō have yellowish moss-green feathers barred or mottled with black or dark brownish grey, blending well with native vegetation. Individuals may have strongly varying degrees of mottling and colour tone and intensity – museum specimens show that some birds had completely yellow colouring. The breast and flank are yellowish-green streaked with yellow. The belly, undertail, neck, and face are predominantly yellowish streaked with pale green and weakly mottled with brownish-grey. Because the feathers do not need the strength and stiffness required for flight, they are exceptionally soft, giving rise to the specific epithet habroptila. The kākāpō has a conspicuous facial disc of fine feathers resembling the face of an owl; thus, early European settlers called it the "owl parrot". The beak is surrounded by delicate feathers which resemble vibrissae or "whiskers"; it is possible kākāpō use these to sense the ground as they walk with their head lowered, but there is no evidence for this. The mandible is variable in colour, mostly ivory, with the upper part often bluish-grey. The eyes are dark brown. Kākāpō feet are large, scaly, and, as in all parrots, zygodactyl (two toes face forward and two backward). The pronounced claws are particularly useful for climbing. The ends of the tail feathers often become worn from being continually dragged on the ground.

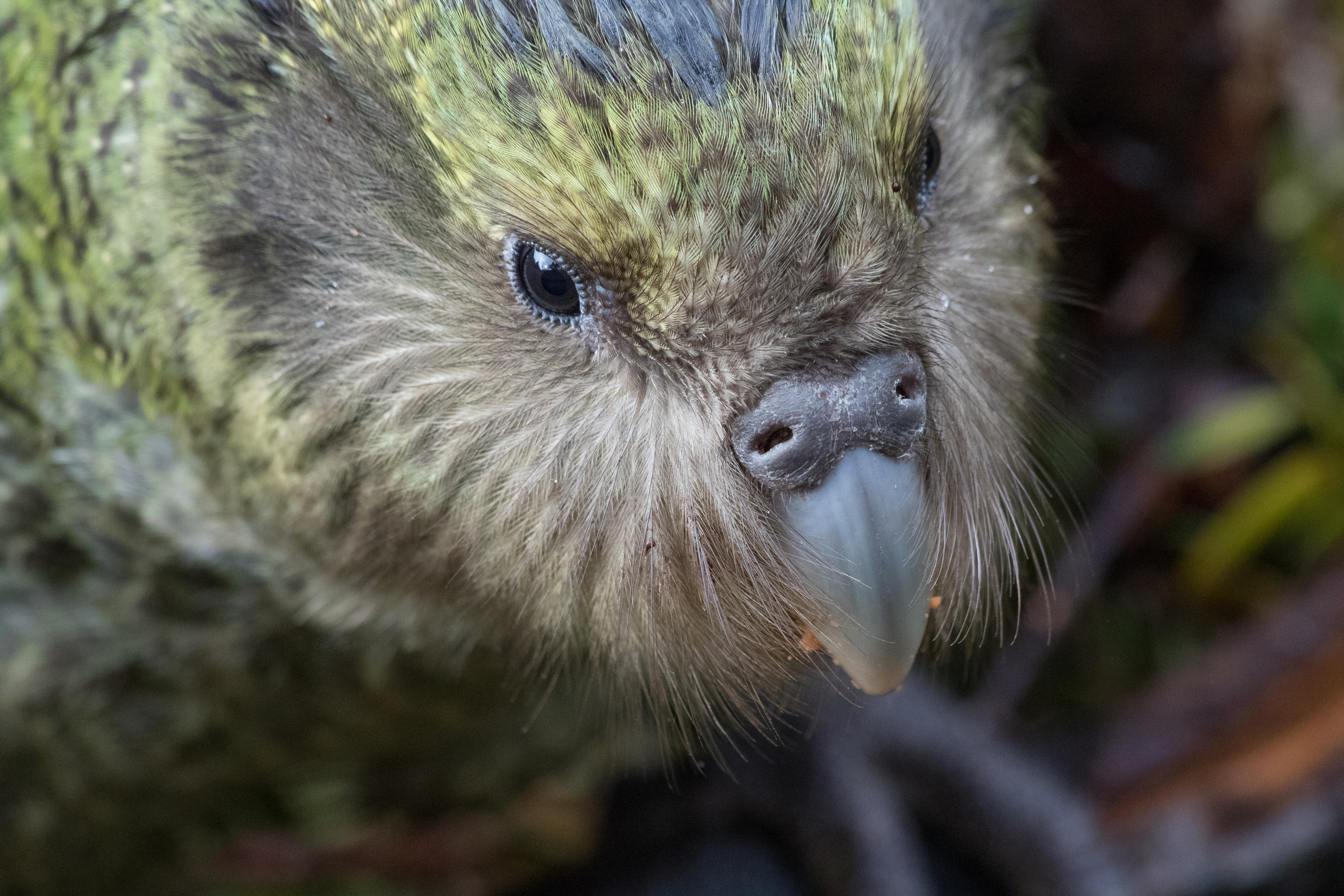
The "whiskers" around the beak

Females are easily distinguished from males as they have a narrower and less domed head, narrower and proportionally longer beak, smaller cere and nostrils, more slender and pinkish grey legs and feet, and proportionally longer tail. While their plumage colour is not very different from that of the male, the toning is more subtle, with less yellow and mottling. Nesting females also have a brood patch of bare skin on the belly.

The kākāpō's altricial young are first covered with greyish white down, through which their pink skin can be easily seen. They become fully feathered at approximately 70 days old. Juvenile individuals tend to have duller green colouration, more uniform black barring, and less yellow present in their feathers. They are additionally distinguishable because of their shorter tails, wings, and beaks. At this stage, they have a ring of short feathers surrounding their irises that resembles eyelashes.

Like many other parrots, kākāpō have a variety of calls. As well as the booms (see below for a recording) and chings of their mating calls, they will often loudly skraark.

The kākāpō has a well-developed sense of smell, which complements its nocturnal lifestyle. It can distinguish between odours while foraging, a behaviour reported in only one other parrot species. The kākāpō has a large olfactory bulb ratio (longest diameter of the olfactory bulb/longest diameter of the brain) indicating that it does, indeed, have a more developed sense of smell than other parrots. One of the most striking characteristics of the kākāpō is its distinct musty-sweet odour. The smell often alerts predators to the presence of kākāpō.

As a nocturnal species, the kākāpō has adapted its senses to living in darkness. Its optic tectum, nucleus rotundus, and entopallium are smaller in relation to its overall brain size than those of diurnal parrots. Its retina shares some qualities with that of other nocturnal birds but also has some qualities typical of diurnal birds, lending to best function around twilight. These modifications allow the kākāpō to have enhanced light sensitivity but with poor visual acuity.

=== Internal anatomy ===
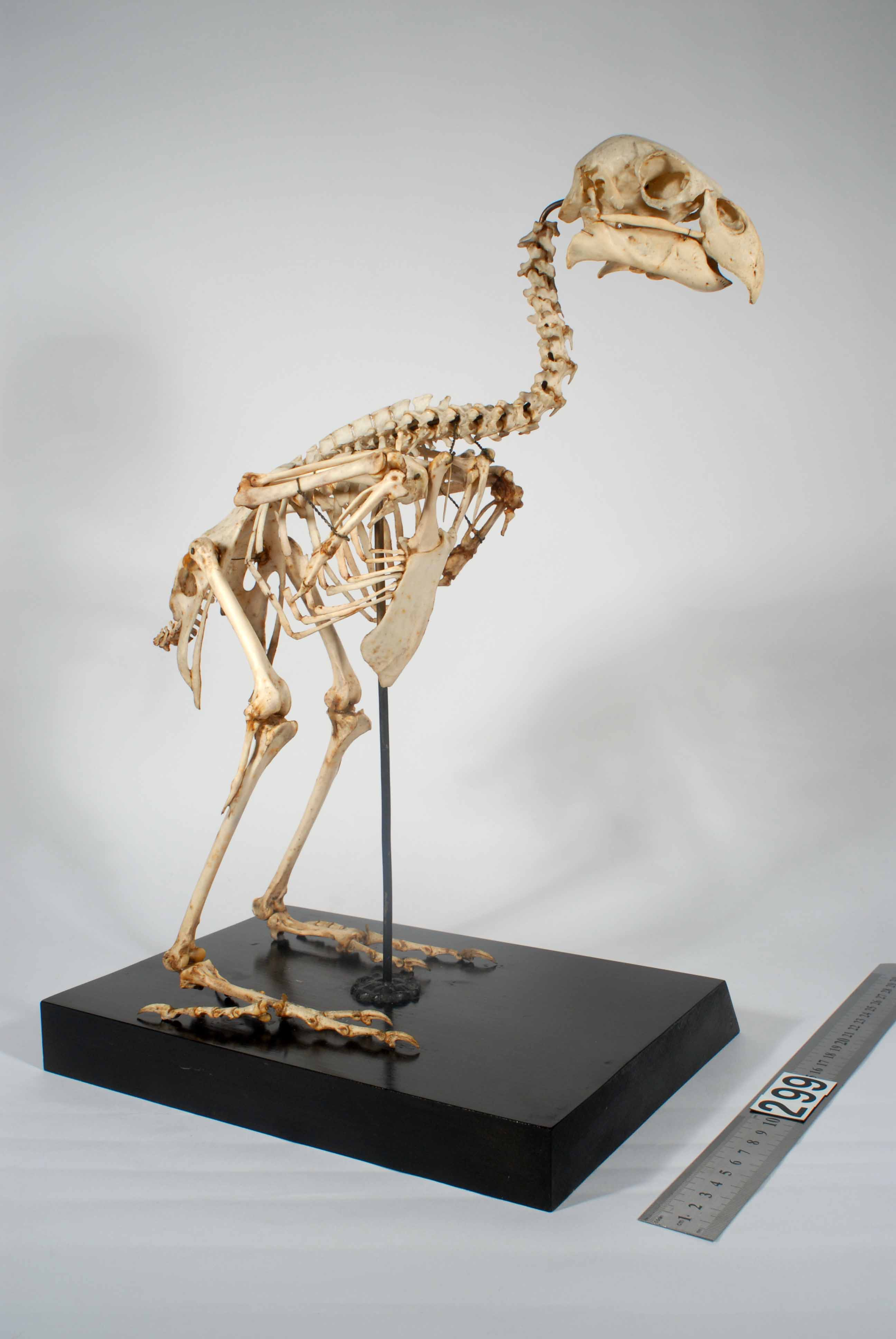
Skeleton

The skeleton of the kākāpō differs from other parrots in several features associated with flightlessness. Firstly, it has the smallest relative wing size of any parrot. Its wing feathers are shorter, more rounded, less asymmetrical, and have fewer distal barbules to lock the feathers together. The sternum is small and has a low, vestigial keel and a shortened spina externa. As in other flightless birds and some flighted parrots, the furcula is not fused but consists of a pair of clavicles lying in contact with each coracoid. As in other flightless birds, the angle between the coracoid and sternum is enlarged. The kākāpō has a larger pelvis than other parrots. The proximal bones of the leg and wing are disproportionately long and the distal elements are disproportionately short.

The pectoral musculature of the kākāpō is also modified by flightlessness. The pectoralis and supracoracoideus muscles are greatly reduced. The propatagialis tendo longus has no distinct muscle belly. The sternocoracoideus is tendinous. There is an extensive cucularis capitis clavicularis muscle that is associated with the large crop.

=== Genetics ===
Because kākāpō passed through a genetic bottleneck, in which their world population was reduced to 49 birds, they are extremely inbred and have low genetic diversity. This manifests in lower disease resistance and infertility problems: 61% of kākāpō eggs fail to hatch. Beginning in 2015, the Kākāpō 125+ project has sequenced the genome of all living kākāpō, as well as some museum specimens. The project is a collaboration led by Genomics Aotearoa and a collaboration with a team of international collaborators.

A DNA sequence analysis was performed on 35 kākāpō genomes of the surviving descendants of an isolated island population, and on 14 genomes, mainly from museum specimens, of the now extinct mainland population. An analysis of the long-term genetic impact of small population size indicated that the small island kākāpō population had a reduced number of harmful mutations compared to the number in mainland individuals. It was hypothesised that the reduced mutational load of the island population was due to a combination of genetic drift and the purging of deleterious mutations through increased inbreeding and purifying selection that occurred since the isolation of this population from the mainland about 10,000 years ago. Purging of deleterious mutations occurs when there is selection against recessive or partially recessive detrimental alleles as they are expressed in the homozygous state.

== Habitat ==
Before the arrival of humans, the kākāpō was widely distributed throughout both main islands of New Zealand. Although it may have inhabited Stewart Island before human arrival, it has not been found in the extensive fossil collections from there. Kākāpō lived in a variety of habitats, including tussocklands, scrublands and coastal areas. It also inhabited forests dominated by podocarps (rimu, mataī, kahikatea, tōtara), beeches, tawa, and rātā. In Fiordland, areas of avalanche and slip debris with regenerating and heavily fruiting vegetation – such as five finger, wineberry, bush lawyer, tutu, hebes, and coprosmas – became known as "kākāpō gardens".

The kākāpō is considered to be a "habitat generalist". Though they are now confined to islands free of predation, they were once able to live in nearly any climate present on the islands of New Zealand. They survived dry, hot summers on the North Island as well as cold winter temperatures in the sub-alpine areas of Fiordland. Kākāpō seem to have preferred broadleaf or mountain beech and Hall's tōtara forest with mild winters and high rainfall, but the species was not exclusively forest-dwelling.

== Ecology and behaviour ==
Historic distribution of the kākāpō: Maximum distribution since 1840 Fossil evidence

The kākāpō is primarily nocturnal; it roosts under cover in trees or on the ground during the day and moves around its territories at night.

Though the kākāpō cannot fly, it is an excellent climber, ascending to the crowns of the tallest trees. While climbing, it frequently uses its wings for balance. It can also "parachute" – descending by leaping and spreading its wings; in this way it may travel a few metres at a steep downward angle of less than 45 degrees. Lighter females can perform short glides across gaps of 3–4 m.

With only 3.3% of its mass made up of pectoral muscle, it is no surprise that the kākāpō cannot use its wings to lift its heavy body off the ground. Because of its flightlessness, it has very low metabolic demands in comparison to flighted birds. It is able to survive easily on very little or on very low quality food sources. Unlike most other bird species, the kākāpō is entirely herbivorous, feeding on fruits, seeds, leaves, stems, and rhizomes. When foraging, kākāpō tend to leave crescent-shaped wads of fibre in the vegetation behind them, called "browse signs".

Having lost the ability to fly, it has developed strong legs. Locomotion is often by way of a rapid "jog-like" gait by which it can move several kilometres. A female has been observed making two return trips each night during nesting from her nest to a food source up to 1 km (0.6 mi) away and the male may walk from its home range to a mating arena up to 5 km (3 mi) away during the mating season (October–January).

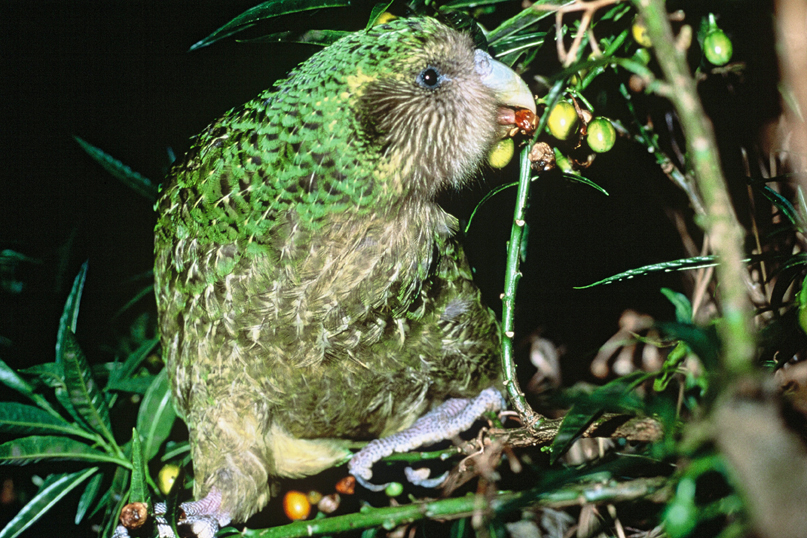
Individual nicknamed Trevor feeding on poroporo fruits, Maud Island

Young birds indulge in play fighting, and one bird will often lock the neck of another under its chin. The kākāpō is curious by nature and has been known to interact with humans. Conservation staff and volunteers have engaged extensively with some kākāpō, which have distinct personalities. Despite this, kākāpō are solitary birds.

The kākāpō was a very successful species in pre-human New Zealand, and was well adapted to avoid the birds of prey which were their only predators. As well as the New Zealand falcon, there were two other birds of prey in pre-human New Zealand: Haast's eagle and Eyles' harrier. All these raptors soared overhead searching for prey in daylight, and to avoid them the kākāpō evolved camouflaged plumage and became nocturnal. When a kākāpō feels threatened, it freezes, so that it is more effectively camouflaged in the vegetation its plumage resembles. Kākāpō were not entirely safe at night, when the laughing owl was active, and it is apparent from owl nest deposits on Canterbury limestone cliffs that kākāpō were among their prey.

Kākāpō defensive adaptations were no use, however, against the mammalian predators introduced to New Zealand by humans. Birds hunt very differently from mammals, relying on their powerful vision to find prey, and thus they usually hunt by day. Mammalian predators, in contrast to birds, often hunt by night, and rely on their sense of smell and hearing to find prey; a common way for humans to hunt kākāpō was by releasing trained dogs. The kākāpō's adaptations to avoid avian predation have thus been useless against its new enemies, and the reason for its massive decline since the introduction of dogs, cats and mustelids (see Conservation: Human impact).

Its intelligence commands respect, and its helplessness sympathy, while its genial nature endears it to all who know it well. It repays kindness with gratitude, and is as affectionate as a dog, and as playful as a kitten.

— Frederick Hutton, The Animals of New Zealand (1912)

=== Breeding ===
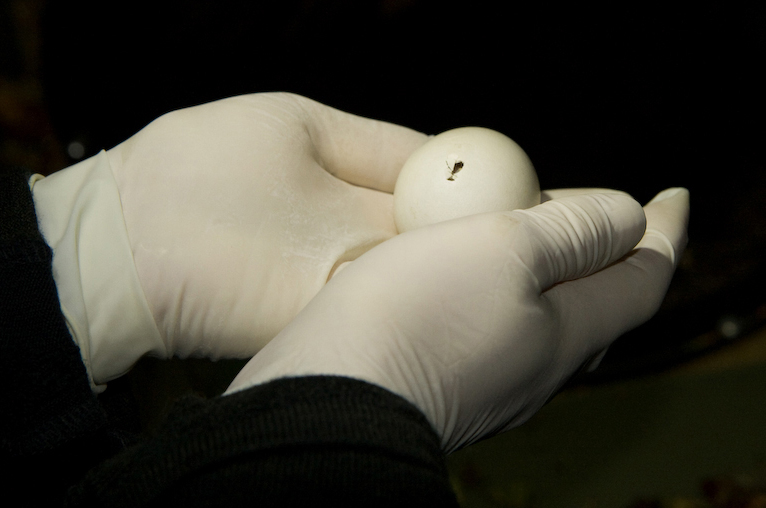
Hatching kākāpō egg

Kākāpō are the only flightless bird that has a lek breeding system. Males loosely gather in an arena and compete with each other to attract females. Females listen to the males as they display, or "lek". They choose a mate based on the quality of his display; they are not pursued by the males in any overt way. No pair bond is formed; males and females meet only to mate.

During the courting season, males leave their home ranges for hilltops and ridges where they establish their own mating courts. These leks can be up to 5 kilometres (3 mi) from a kākāpō's usual territory and are an average of 50 metres (160 ft) apart within the lek arena. Males remain in the region of their court throughout the courting season. At the start of the breeding season, males will fight to try to secure the best courts. They confront each other with raised feathers, spread wings, open beaks, raised claws and loud screeching and growling. Fighting may leave birds with injuries or even kill them. Mating occurs roughly every two to four years in years of heavy rimu fruiting. In mating years, males may make "booming" calls for 6–8 hours every night for more than four months.

The sound of a kākāpō booming

Each court consists of one or more saucer-shaped depressions or "bowls" dug in the ground by the male, up to 10 centimetres (4 in) deep and long enough to fit the half-metre length of the bird. The kākāpō is one of only a handful of birds in the world which actually constructs its leks. Bowls are often created next to rock faces, banks, or tree trunks to help reflect sound: the bowls themselves function as amplifiers to enhance the projection of the males' booming mating calls. Each male's bowls are connected by a network of trails or tracks which may extend 50 metres (160 ft) along a ridge or 20 metres (70 ft) in diameter around a hilltop. Males meticulously clear their bowls and tracks of debris.

To attract females, males make loud, low-frequency (below 100 Hz) booming calls from their bowls by inflating a thoracic sac. They start with low grunts, which increase in volume as the sac inflates. After a sequence of about 20 loud booms, the male kākāpō emits a high-frequency, metallic "ching" sound. He stands for a short while before again lowering his head, inflating his chest and starting another sequence of booms. The booms can be heard at least 1 kilometre (0.62 mi) away on a still night; wind can carry the sound at least 5 kilometres (3.1 mi).

Females are attracted by the booms of the competing males; they too may need to walk several kilometres from their territories to the arena. Once a female enters the court of one of the males, the male performs a display in which he rocks from side to side and makes clicking noises with his beak. He turns his back to the female, spreads his wings in display and walks backwards towards her. He will then attempt copulation for 40 minutes or more. Once the birds have mated, the female returns to her home territory to lay eggs and raise the chicks. The male continues booming in the hope of attracting another female.

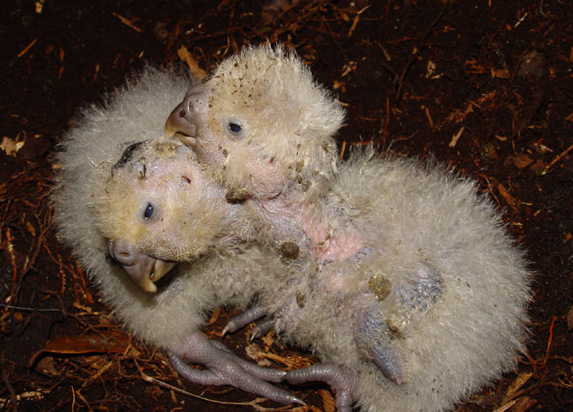
Hatchlings

The female kākāpō lays 1–4 eggs per breeding cycle, with several days between eggs. The nest is placed on the ground under the cover of plants or in cavities such as hollow tree trunks. The female incubates the eggs beginning after the first egg is laid, but is forced to leave the nest every night in search of food. Predators are known to eat the eggs, and the embryos inside can also die of cold in the mother's absence. Kākāpō eggs usually hatch within 30 days, bearing fluffy grey chicks that are quite helpless. The female feeds the chicks for three months, and the chicks remain with the female for some months after fledging. The young chicks are just as vulnerable to predators as the eggs, and young have been killed by many of the same predators that attack adults. Chicks leave the nest at approximately 10 to 12 weeks of age. As they gain greater independence, their mothers may feed the chicks sporadically for up to 3 months.

The kākāpō is long-lived, with an average life expectancy of 60 (plus or minus 20) years, and tends to reach adolescence before it starts breeding. Males start booming at about 5 years of age. It was thought that females reached sexual maturity at 9 years of age, but four five-year-old females have now been recorded reproducing. The kākāpō does not breed every year and has one of the lowest rates of reproduction among birds. Breeding occurs only in years when trees mast (fruit heavily), providing a plentiful food supply. Rimu mast occurs only every three to five years, so in rimu-dominant forests, such as those on Whenua Hou, kākāpō breeding occurs infrequently.

Another aspect of the kākāpō's breeding system is that a female can alter the sex ratio of her offspring depending on her condition. A female in good condition produces more male offspring (males have 30%–40% more body weight than females). Females produce offspring biased towards the non-dispersive sex (females) when competition for resources (such as food) is high and towards the dispersive sex (males) when food is plentiful. A female kākāpō will likely be able to produce eggs even when there are few resources, while a male kākāpō will be more capable of perpetuating the species when there are plenty, by mating with several females. This supports the Trivers–Willard hypothesis. The relationship between clutch sex ratio and maternal diet has conservation implications, because a captive population maintained on a high quality diet will produce fewer females and therefore fewer individuals valuable to the recovery of the species.

=== Feeding ===
The beak of the kākāpō is adapted for grinding food finely. For this reason, the kākāpō has a very small gizzard compared to other birds of their size. It is entirely herbivorous, eating green shoots, leaf buds, roots, rhizomes and tubers of native plants, as well as seeds, nuts, berries, other fruits, pollen, moss, fungi and even the bark and sapwood of trees. A study in 1984 identified 25 plant species as kākāpō food. It is specifically fond of the fruit of the rimu tree, and will feed on it exclusively during seasons when it is abundant. The kākāpō strips out the nutritious parts of the plant with its beak, leaving a ball of indigestible fibre. These little clumps of plant fibres are a distinctive sign of the presence of the bird. The kākāpō is believed to employ bacteria in the fore-gut to ferment and help digest plant matter.

Kākāpō diet changes according to the season. The plants eaten most frequently during the year include some species of Lycopodium ramulosum, Lycopodium fastigium, Schizaea fistulosa, Blechnum minus, Blechnum procerum, Cyathodes juniperina, Dracophyllum longifolium, Olearia colensoi and Thelymitra venosa. Individual plants of the same species are often treated differently. Kākāpō may forage heavily in certain areas, leaving, on occasion, more than 30 droppings and conspicuous evidence of herbivory. These areas, which are mostly dominated by mānuka and yellow silver pine, range from 100 – 5,000 sq. metres (1,076 – 53,820 sq. feet) per individual.

Preserved coprolites of kākāpō have been studied to obtain information on the historic diet of the bird. This research has identified 67 native plant genera previously unrecorded as food sources for kākāpō including native mistletoes as well as Dactylanthus taylorii.

== Conservation ==
Fossil records indicate that in pre-Polynesian times, the kākāpō was New Zealand's third most common bird and it was widespread on all three main islands. However, the kākāpō population in New Zealand has declined massively since human settlement of the country, and its conservation status as ranked by the Department of Conservation continues to be "Nationally Critical". Since the 1890s, conservation efforts have been made to prevent extinction. The most successful scheme has been the Kākāpō Recovery Programme; this was implemented in 1995 and continues to this day. Kākāpō are absolutely protected under New Zealand's Wildlife Act 1953. The species is also listed under Appendix I of the Convention on International Trade in Endangered Species of Wild Fauna and Flora (CITES) meaning international export/import (including parts and derivatives) is regulated.

=== Human impact ===
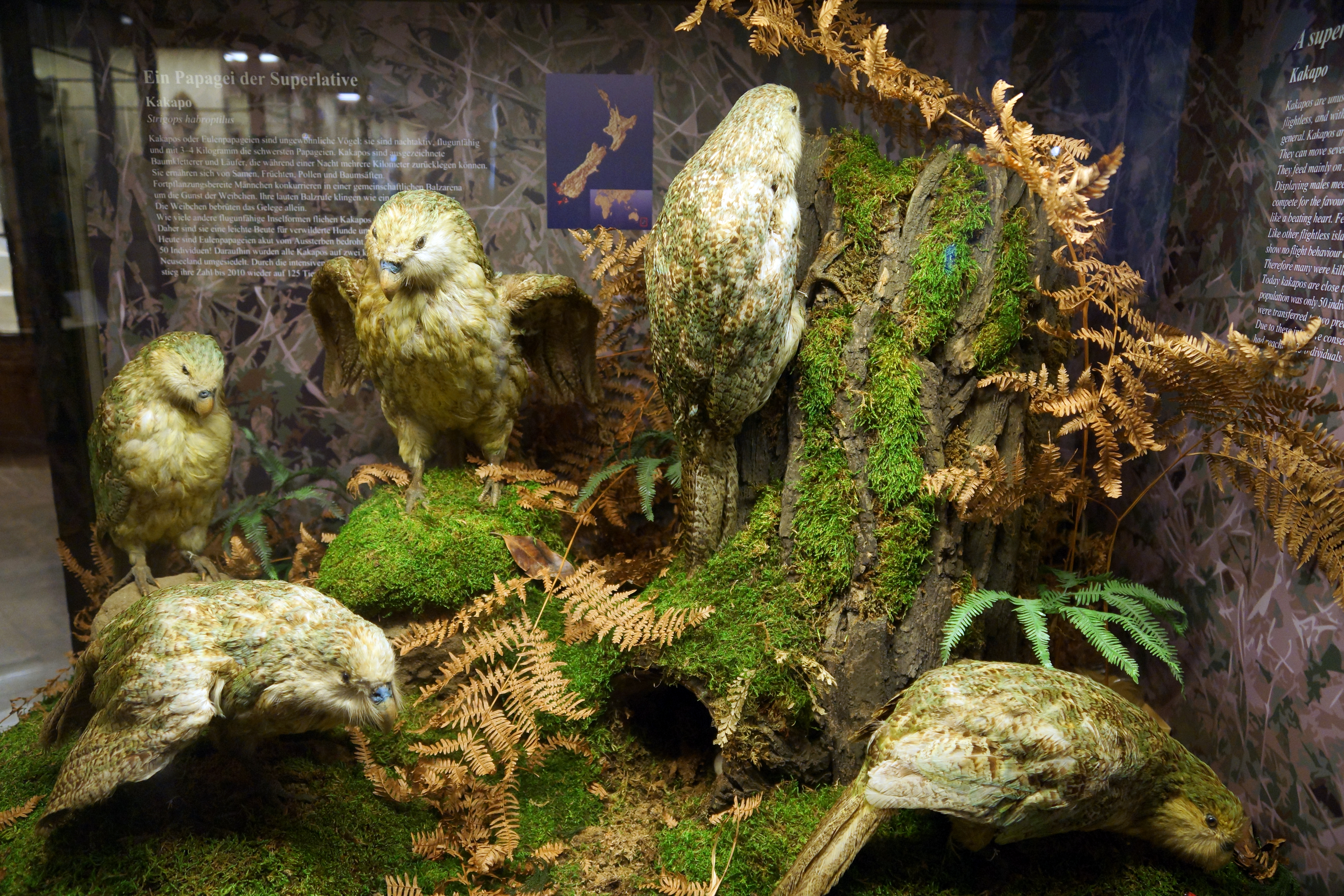
Specimens at the Vienna Museum of Natural History: thousands of kākāpō were collected for museums across the world.

The first factor in the decline of the kākāpō was the arrival of humans. Māori folklore suggests that the kākāpō was found throughout the country when the Polynesians first arrived in New Zealand 700 years ago. Subfossil and midden deposits show that the bird was present throughout the North, South and Stewart Island before and during early Māori times. Māori hunted the kākāpō for food and for their skins and feathers, which were made into cloaks.

Due to its inability to fly, strong scent and habit of freezing when threatened, the kākāpō was easy prey for the Māori and their dogs. Its eggs and chicks were also preyed upon by the Polynesian rat or kiore, which the Māori brought to New Zealand as a stowaway. Furthermore, the deliberate clearing of vegetation by Māori reduced the habitable range for kākāpō. Although the kākāpō was extinct in many parts of the islands by the time Europeans arrived, including the Tararua and Aorangi Ranges, it was still in the central North Island and forested parts of the South Island.

Although kākāpō numbers were reduced by Māori settlement, they declined much more rapidly after European colonisation. Beginning in the 1840s, Pākehā settlers cleared vast tracts of land for farming and grazing, further reducing kākāpō habitat. They brought more dogs and other mammalian predators, including domestic cats, black rats and stoats. Europeans knew little of the kākāpō until Gray described it from a skin in 1845. As the Māori had done, early European explorers and their dogs ate kākāpō. In the late 19th century, the kākāpō became well known as a scientific curiosity, and thousands were captured or killed for zoos, museums and collectors. Most captured specimens died within months. From at least the 1870s, collectors knew the kākāpō population was declining; their prime concern was to collect as many as possible before the bird became extinct.

In the 1880s, large numbers of mustelids (stoats, ferrets and weasels) were released in New Zealand to reduce rabbit numbers, but they also preyed heavily on many native species including the kākāpō. Other browsing animals, such as introduced deer, competed with the kākāpō for food, and caused the extinction of some of its preferred plant species. The kākāpō was reportedly still present near the head of the Whanganui River as late as 1894, with one of the last records of a kākāpō in the North Island being a single bird caught in the Kaimanawa Ranges by Te Kepa Puawheawhe in 1895.

=== Early protection efforts ===
In 1891, the New Zealand government set aside Resolution Island in Fiordland as a nature reserve. In 1894, the government appointed Richard Henry as caretaker. A keen naturalist, Henry was aware that native birds were declining, and began catching and moving kākāpō and kiwi from the mainland to the predator-free Resolution Island. In six years, he moved more than 200 kākāpō to Resolution Island. By 1900, however, stoats had swum to Resolution Island and colonised it; they wiped out the nascent kākāpō population within 6 years.

In 1903, three kākāpō were moved from Resolution Island to the nature reserve of Little Barrier Island (Hauturu-o-Toi) north-east of Auckland, but feral cats were present and the kākāpō were never seen again. In 1912, three kākāpō were moved to another reserve, Kapiti Island, north-west of Wellington. One of them survived until at least 1936, despite the presence of feral cats for part of the intervening period.

By the 1920s, the kākāpō was extinct in the North Island and its range and numbers in the South Island were declining. One of its last refuges was rugged Fiordland. There, during the 1930s, it was often seen or heard, and occasionally eaten, by hunters or roadworkers. By the 1940s, reports of kākāpō were becoming scarce.

=== 1950–1989 conservation efforts ===
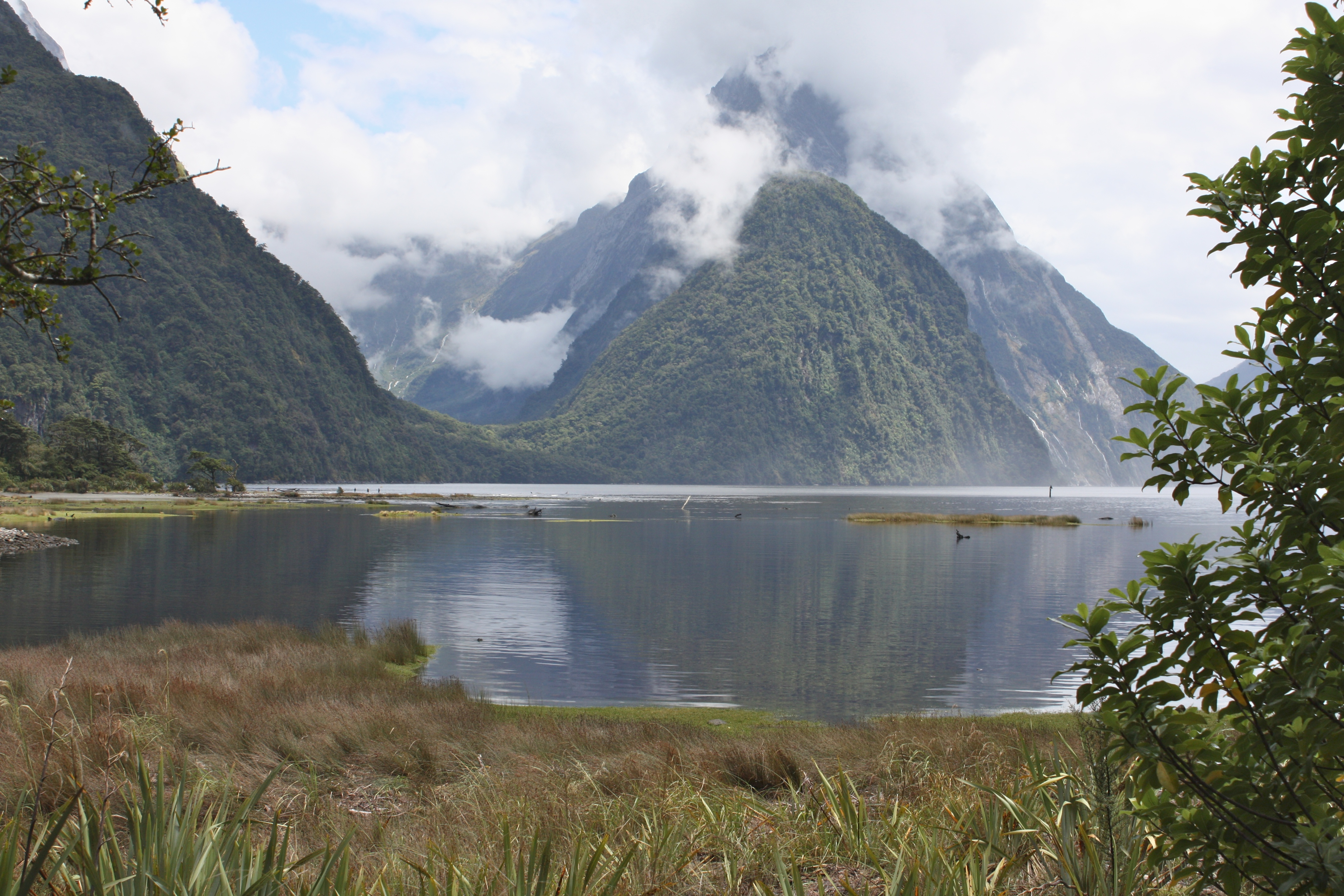
Sinbad Gully in Fiordland, seen between the mountains on the far side of a fiord, was one of the last strongholds of the kākāpō on mainland New Zealand.

In the 1950s, the New Zealand Wildlife Service was established and began making regular expeditions to search for the kākāpō, mostly in Fiordland and what is now the Kahurangi National Park in the northwest of the South Island. Seven Fiordland expeditions between 1951 and 1956 found only a few recent signs. Finally, in 1958 a kākāpō was caught and released in the Milford Sound / Piopiotahi catchment area in Fiordland. Six more kākāpō were captured in 1961; one was released and the other five were transferred to the aviaries of the Mount Bruce Bird Reserve near Masterton in the North Island. Within months, four of the birds had died and the fifth died after about four years. In the next 12 years, regular expeditions found few signs of the kākāpō, indicating that numbers were continuing to decline. Only one bird was captured in 1967; it died the following year.

By the early 1970s, it was uncertain whether the kākāpō was still an extant species. At the end of 1974, scientists located several more male kākāpō and made the first scientific observations of kākāpō booming. These observations led Don Merton to speculate for the first time that the kākāpō had a lek breeding system. From 1974 to 1978 a total of 18 kākāpō were discovered in Fiordland, but all were males. This raised the possibility that the species would become extinct, because there might be no surviving females. One male bird was captured in the Milford area in 1975, christened "Richard Henry", and transferred to Maud Island. All the birds the Wildlife Service discovered from 1951 to 1976 were in U-shaped glaciated valleys flanked by almost-vertical cliffs and surrounded by high mountains. Such extreme terrain had slowed colonisation by browsing mammals, leaving islands of virtually unmodified native vegetation. However, even here, stoats were present and by 1976 the kākāpō was gone from the valley floors and only a few males survived high on the most inaccessible parts of the cliffs.

Before 1977, no expedition had been to Stewart Island to search for the bird. In 1977, sightings of kākāpō were reported on the island. An expedition to Rakiura found a track and bowl system on its first day; soon after, it located several dozen kākāpō. The finding in an eight-thousand-hectare (twenty-thousand-acre) area of fire-modified scrubland and forest raised hope that the population would include females. The total population was estimated at 100 to 200 birds.

Mustelids have never colonised Stewart Island, but feral cats were present. During a survey, it was apparent that cats killed kākāpō at a rate of 56% per year. At this rate, the birds could not survive on the island and therefore an intensive cat control was introduced in 1982, after which no cat-killed kākāpō were found. However, to ensure the survival of the remaining birds, scientists decided later that this population should be transferred to predator-free islands; this operation was carried out between 1982 and 1997.

=== Kākāpō Recovery programme ===
Kākāpō translocations 1974–1992
Translocated to	Number of kākāpō	Deaths < 6 months	Survived as of November 1992
Maud Island (1974–81)	9 (6♂, 3♀)	3 (2♂, 1♀)	4 (2♂, 2♀)
Little Barrier Island (1982)	22 (13♂, 9♀)	2 (1♂, 1♀)	15–19 (10–12♂, 5–7♀)
Codfish Island / Whenua Hou (1987–92)	30 (20♂, 10♀)	0	20–30 (13–20♂, 7–10♀)
Maud Island (1989–91)	6 (4♂, 2♀)	0	5 (3♂, 2♀)
Mana Island (1992)	2 (2♀)	1 (1♀)	1 (1♀)
Total	65 (43♂, 22♀)	6 (3♂, 3♀)	41–55 (27–36♂, 14–19♀)
Note: ♂ = males, ♀ = females.

In the 1980s the kākāpō were translocated to islands with no predators to maintain their genetic diversity, to avoid spreading harmful diseases, and to reduce interbreeding.

In 1989, a Kākāpō Recovery plan was developed, and a Kākāpō Recovery programme was established in 1995. The New Zealand Department of Conservation replaced the Wildlife Service for this task.

The first action of the plan was to relocate all the remaining kākāpō to suitable islands for them to breed. None of the New Zealand islands were ideal to establish kākāpō without rehabilitation by extensive re-vegetation and the eradication of introduced mammalian predators and competitors. Four islands were finally chosen: Maud, Little Barrier, Codfish and Mana. Sixty-five kākāpō (43 males, 22 females) were successfully transferred onto the four islands in five translocations. Some islands had to be rehabilitated several times when feral cats, stoats and weka kept appearing. Little Barrier Island was eventually viewed as unsuitable due to the rugged landscape, the thick forest and the continued presence of rats, and its birds were evacuated in 1998. Along with Mana Island, it was replaced with two new kākāpō sanctuaries: Chalky Island (Te Kākahu-o-Tamatea) and Anchor Island. The entire kākāpō population of Codfish Island was temporarily relocated in 1999 to Pearl Island in Port Pegasus while rats were being eliminated from Codfish. All kākāpō on Pearl and Chalky Islands were moved to Anchor Island in 2005.

==== Supplementary feeding ====
A key part of the Recovery Programme is the supplementary feeding of females. Kākāpō breed only once every two to five years, when certain plant species, primarily Dacrydium cupressinum (rimu), produce protein-rich fruit and seeds. During breeding years when rimu masts supplementary food is provided to kākāpō to increase the likelihood of individuals successfully breeding. In 1989, six preferred foods (apples, sweet potatoes, almonds, Brazil nuts, sunflower seeds and walnuts) were supplied ad libitum each night to 12 feeding stations. Males and females ate the supplied foods, and females nested on Little Barrier Island in the summers of 1989–1991 for the first time since 1982, although nesting success was low.

Supplementary feeding affects the sex ratio of kākāpō offspring, and can be used to increase the number of female chicks by deliberately manipulating maternal condition. During the winter of 1981, only females lighter than 1.5 kg (3.3 lb) were given supplementary feeding to avoid raising their body condition, and the sex ratio results in 1982 were close to parity, eliminating the male-biased sex ratios in the unrestricted feeding.

Today commercial parrot food is supplied to all individuals of breeding age on Whenua Hou and Anchor. The amount eaten and individual weights are carefully monitored to ensure that optimum body condition is maintained.

==== Nest management ====
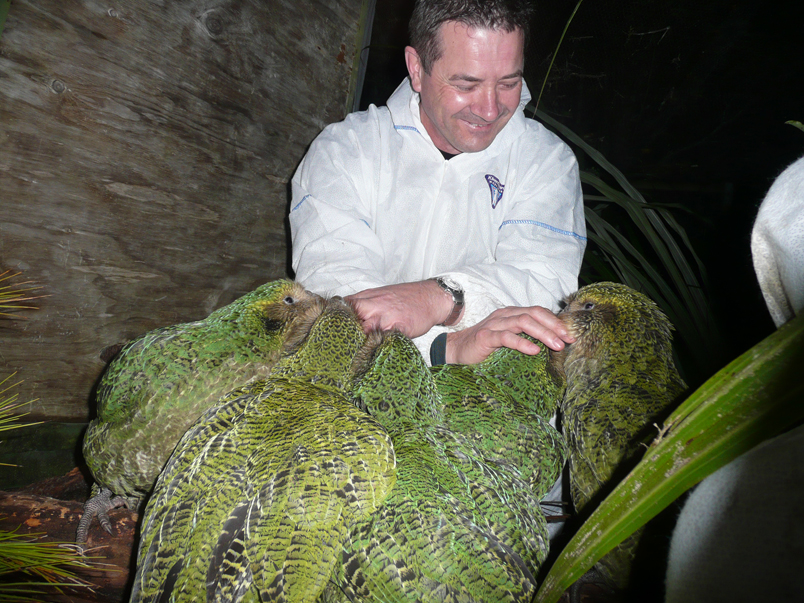
Department of Conservation worker with chicks

Kākāpō nests are intensively managed by wildlife conservation staff. Before Polynesian rats were removed from Whenua Hou, the rats were a threat to the survival of young kākāpō. Of 21 chicks that hatched between 1981 and 1994, nine were either killed by rats or died and were subsequently eaten by rats. Kākāpō nest protection was intensified after 1995 by using rat traps and rat poison stations as soon as a kākāpō nest was detected. A small video camera and infra-red light source would watch the nest continuously and scare approaching rats with flashing lights and loud popping sounds.

All kākāpō islands are now rat-free, but infrared cameras still allow rangers to remotely monitor the behaviour of females and chicks in nests. Data loggers record when mother kākāpō come and go, allowing rangers to pick a time to check on the health of chicks, and also indicate how hard females are having to work to find food. Because mother kākāpō often struggle to successfully rear multiple chicks, Kākāpō Recovery rangers will move chicks between nests as needed.

Eggs are often removed from nests for incubation to reduce the likelihood of accidents, such as lost eggs or crushing. If chicks become ill, are not putting on weight, or there are too many chicks in the nest (and no available nest to move them to) they will be hand-reared by the Kākāpō Recovery team. In the 2019 season, eggs were also removed from nests to encourage females to re-nest. By hand-raising the first group of chicks in captivity and encouraging females to lay more eggs, the Kākāpō Recovery Team hoped that overall chick production would be increased. By the end of February 2020, the bird's summer breeding season, these efforts led to the production of 80 chicks, "a record number."

==== Monitoring ====
To monitor the kākāpō population continuously, each bird is equipped with a radio transmitter. Every known kākāpō, barring some young chicks, has been given a name by Kākāpō Recovery Programme officials, and detailed data is gathered about every individual. GPS transmitters are also being trialled to provide more detailed data about the movement of individual birds and their habitat use. The signals also provide behavioural data, letting rangers gather information about mating and nesting remotely. Every individual kākāpō receives an annual health check and has their transmitter replaced.

==== Reintroduction ====
The Kākāpō Recovery programme has been successful, with the numbers of kākāpō increasing steadily. Adult survival rate and productivity have both improved significantly since the programme's inception. However, the main goal is to establish at least one viable, self-sustaining, unmanaged population of kākāpō as a functional component of the ecosystem in a protected habitat. To help meet this conservation challenge, Resolution Island (20,860 ha (51,500 acres)) in Fiordland has been prepared for kākāpō re-introduction with ecological restoration including the eradication of stoats. Ultimately, the Kākāpō Recovery vision for the species is to restore the mauri (Māori for "life-force") of the kākāpō by breeding 150 adult females.

Four males were re-introduced to Sanctuary Mountain Maungatautari in the North Island on 21 July 2023, becoming the first kākāpō living in mainland New Zealand in almost 40 years. Despite extensive improvements to the perimeter fence, in October 2023, one of the kākāpō escaped by using a downed tree to climb out. The bird was located using the signal from its GPS transmitter and returned to the sanctuary. A second group of six birds was introduced to the sanctuary in September. However, two further kākāpō found a way over the fence, and in November the Department of Conservation temporarily removed three birds from the sanctuary to a southern predator-free island, leaving the kākāpō population in the sanctuary at seven. The Department commented that "Kākāpō are flightless but are excellent climbers who can use their wings to parachute from treetops".

==== Fatal fungal infection ====
In 2019 an outbreak of the fungal disease aspergillosis among kākāpō on the island of Whenua Hou infected 21 individuals and led to 9 deaths: two adults, five chicks and two juveniles. Over 50 birds were transported to veterinary centres for diagnostics and treatment.

== Population timeline ==
Cat control in 1982 slowed a sharp decline in kākāpō numbers, and they have recently increased under the Kākāpō Recovery plan. Red arrows indicate breeding years. Numbers become less precise before 1995, with the 1977 figure perhaps out by 50 birds.

- 1977: Kākāpō rediscovered on Stewart Island
- 1989: Most kākāpō are removed from Rakiura to Whenua Hou and Hauturu-O-Toi
- 1995: Kākāpō population consists of 51 individuals; beginning of the Kakapo Recovery Programme
- 1999: Kākāpō removed from Hauturu
- 2002: A significant breeding season led to 24 chicks being hatched
- 2005: 41 females and 45 males, including four fledglings (3 females and 1 male); kākāpō established on Anchor Island
- 2009: The total kākāpō population rose to over 100 for the first time since monitoring began. Twenty-two of the 34 chicks had to be hand-reared because of a shortage of food on Codfish Island.
- December 2010: Death of the oldest known kākāpō, "Richard Henry", possibly 80 years old.
- 2012: Seven kākāpō transferred to Hauturu, in an attempt to establish a successful breeding programme. Kākāpō were last on the island in 1999.
- March 2014: With the kākāpō population having increased to 126, the bird's recovery was used by Melbourne artist Sayraphim Lothian as a metaphor for the recovery of Christchurch, paralleling the "indomitable spirit of these two communities and their determination to rebuild". Two of the soft sculptures from the project were later added to New Zealand museum collections: Little Robbie at the Museum of New Zealand Te Papa Tongarewa and Little Rā at Canterbury Museum.
- 2016: First breeding on Anchor; a significant breeding season, with 32 chicks; kākāpō population grows to over 150
- 2018: After the death of 3 birds, the population reduced to 149 birds.
- 2019: An abundance of rimu fruit and the introduction of several new technologies (including artificial insemination and 'smart eggs') helped make 2019 the best breeding season on record, with over 200 eggs laid and 72 chicks fledged. According to the Kākāpō Recovery Team at the New Zealand Department of Conservation, this was the earliest and longest breeding season yet. Population reached 200 juvenile or older birds on 17 August 2019.
- 2022: The population increased to 252 birds after a productive breeding season and successful artificial insemination.
- 2023: Birds are reintroduced to the mainland for the first time.
- 2024: As of September 2024, the population had declined slightly to 243 individuals.
- 2026: The DOC Kākāpō Recovery Programme announced that ninety chicks from the 2026 breeding season had fledged, raising the official population to 325 birds.

== In Māori culture ==
The kākāpō is associated with a rich tradition of Māori folklore and beliefs. The bird's irregular breeding cycle was understood to be associated with heavy fruiting or "masting" events of particular plant species such as the rimu, which led Māori to credit the bird with the ability to tell the future. Used to substantiate this claim were reported observations of these birds dropping the berries of the hinau and tawa trees (when they were in season) into secluded pools of water to preserve them as a food supply for the summer ahead; in legend this became the origin of the Māori practice of immersing food in water for the same purpose.

=== Use for food and clothing ===
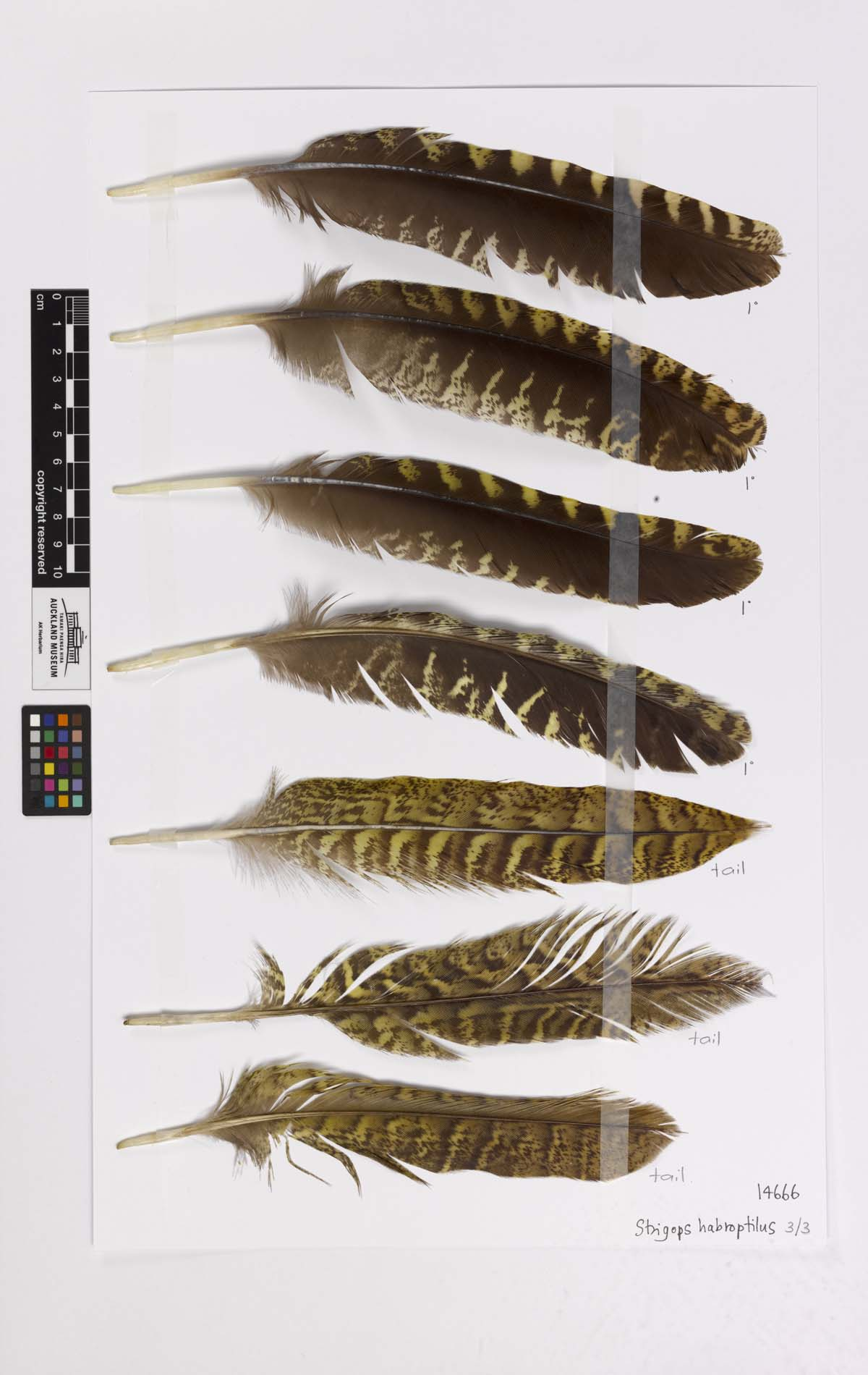
Feathers

The Māori considered the meat of the kākāpō a delicacy and, when the bird was widespread, hunted it for food. One source states that its flesh "resembles lamb in taste and texture", although European settlers have described the bird as having a "strong and slightly stringent [sic] flavour".

In breeding years, the loud booming calls of the males at their mating arenas made it easy for Māori hunting parties to track the kākāpō down, and it was also hunted while feeding or when dust-bathing in dry weather. The bird was caught, generally at night, using snares, pitfall traps, or by groups of domesticated Polynesian dogs which accompanied hunting parties – sometimes they would use fire sticks of various sorts to dazzle a bird in the darkness, stopping it in their tracks and making the capture easier. Cooking was done in a hāngī or in gourds of boiling oil. The flesh of the bird could be preserved in its own fat and stored in containers for later consumption – hunters of the Ngāi Tahu iwi would pack the flesh in baskets made from the inner bark of tōtara tree or in containers constructed from kelp. Bundles of kākāpō tail feathers were attached to the sides of these containers to provide decoration and a way to identify their contents. The Māori also used the bird's eggs for food.

As well as eating the meat of the kākāpō, Māori would use kākāpō skins with the feathers still attached or individually weave in kākāpō feathers with flax fibre to create cloaks and capes. Each one required up to 11,000 feathers to make. Not only were these garments considered very beautiful, they also kept the wearer very warm. They were highly valued and considered as taonga (treasures), so much so that the old Māori adage "You have a kākāpō cape and you still complain of the cold" was used to describe someone who is never satisfied. Only one cloak fully made of kākāpō feathers is known to still exist. It dates from the 1810s–1820s and is held in the Perth Museum in Scotland; the museum in collaboration with the British Museum and Māori advisers have restored the cloak. Kākāpō feathers were also used to decorate the heads of taiaha, but were removed before use in combat.

Despite this, the kākāpō was also regarded as an affectionate pet by the Māori. This was corroborated by European settlers in New Zealand in the 19th century, among them George Edward Grey, who once wrote in a letter to an associate that his pet kākāpō's behaviour towards him and his friends was "more like that of a dog than a bird".

== In the media ==
The conservation of the kākāpō has made the species well known. Many books and documentaries detailing the plight of the kākāpō have been produced in recent years, one of the earliest being Two in the Bush, made by Gerald Durrell for the BBC in 1962.

A feature-length documentary, The Unnatural History of the Kakapo won two major awards at the Reel Earth Environmental Film Festival. Two of the most significant documentaries, both made by NHNZ, are Kakapo – Night Parrot (1982) and To Save the Kakapo (1997).

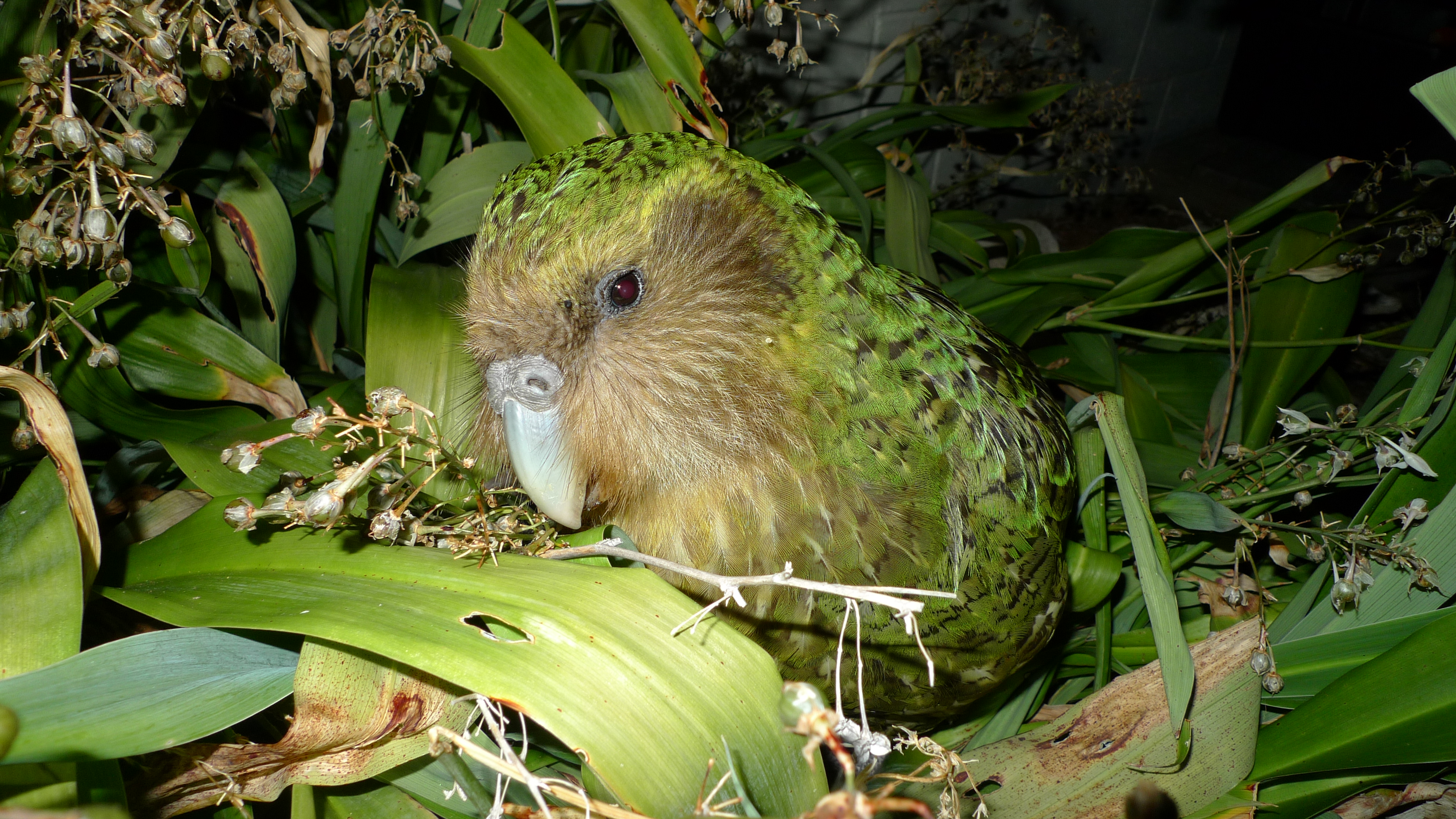
Sirocco on Maud Island

The BBC's Natural History Unit featured the kākāpō, including a sequence with Sir David Attenborough in The Life of Birds. It was one of the endangered animals Douglas Adams and Mark Carwardine set out to find for the radio series and book Last Chance to See. An updated version of the series has been produced for BBC TV, in which Stephen Fry and Carwardine revisit the animals to see how they are getting on almost 20 years later, and in January 2009, they spent time filming the kākāpō on Codfish Island / Whenua Hou. Footage of a kākāpō named Sirocco attempting to mate with Carwardine's head was viewed by millions worldwide, leading to Sirocco becoming "spokes-bird" for New Zealand wildlife conservation in 2010. Sirocco became the inspiration for the party parrot, a popular animated emoji frequently associated with the workflow application Slack.

The kākāpō was featured in the episode "Strange Islands" of the documentary series South Pacific, originally aired on 13 June 2009, in the episode "Worlds Apart" of the series The Living Planet, and in episode 3 of the BBC's New Zealand Earth's Mythical Islands.

In a 2019 kākāpō awareness campaign, the Kākāpō Recovery Programme New Zealand National Partner, Meridian Energy, ran a Search for a Saxophonist to provide suitable mood music for encouraging mating to coincide with the 2019 kākāpō breeding season. The search and footage from the islands where breeding was taking place were featured on the Breakfast programme. The kākāpō was featured in the mobile game "Kākāpō Run" developed by a UK conservation charity. This game aimed to raise support for kākāpō conservation by engaging players in fun, educational gameplay. A study found that playing the game helped increase positive attitudes and actions related to kākāpō protection, such as support for managing invasive predators and responsible pet care, though it did not lead to more donations.

The bird was voted New Zealand's bird of the year in 2008 and 2020.

== See also ==
- Cats in New Zealand
- Conservation in New Zealand
- Island syndrome

== Sources ==
- Higgins, P.J., ed. (1999). "Strigops habroptilus Kakapo" ( (PDF)). Handbook of Australian, New Zealand & Antarctic Birds. Vol. 4: Parrots to Dollarbird. Melbourne, Victoria: Oxford University Press. pp. 633–646. ISBN 978-0-19-553071-1. Archived from the original on 17 June 2024.
