= Codfish Island / Whenua Hou =

Island of New Zealand

Whenua Hou (Māori)
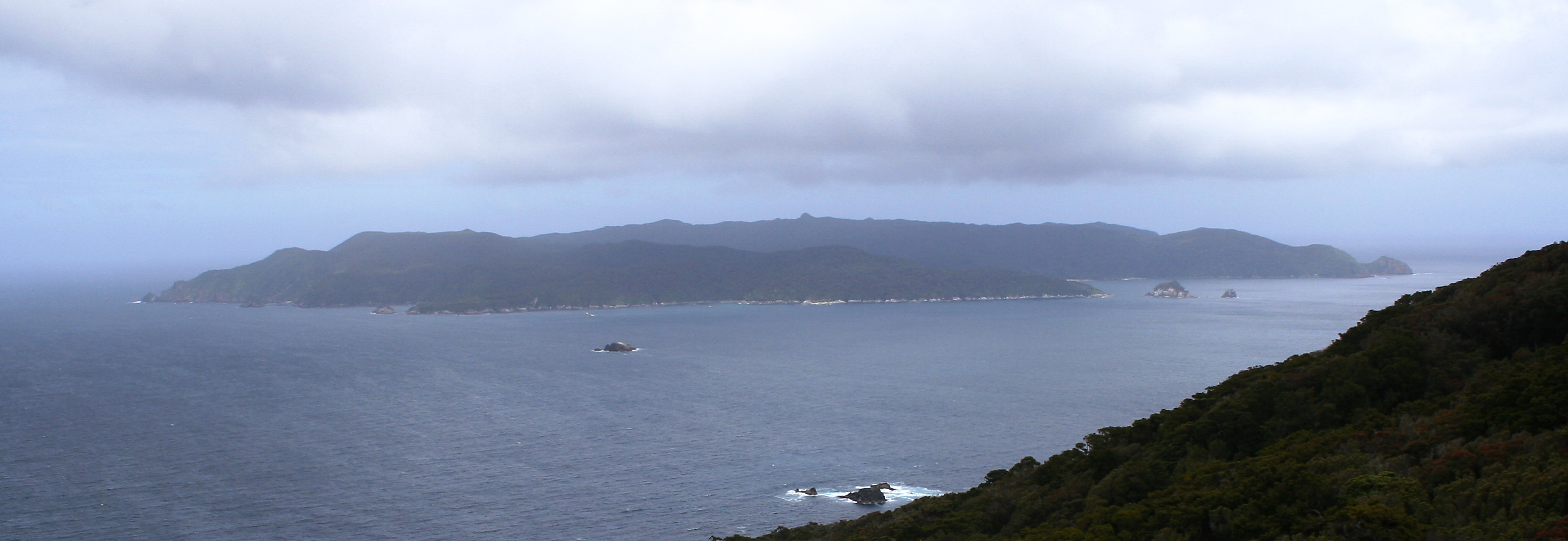
- Codfish Island / Whenua Hou as viewed from neighbouring Stewart Island / Rakiura

- Map of Stewart Island / Rakiura, with Codfish Island / Whenua Hou to the northwest.

Geography
- Location: Tasman Sea
- Coordinates: 46°47′S 167°38′E
- Archipelago: New Zealand archipelago
- Total islands: 1
- Area: 14 km^{2} (5.4 sq mi)
- Highest elevation: 250 m (820 ft)

Administration
- New Zealand
- Region: Southland Region

Demographics
- Population: Uninhabited (2023)

Codfish Island / Whenua Hou is a small island (14 km^{2} or 5.4 sq mi) located to the west of Stewart Island in southern New Zealand. It reaches a height of 250 m (820 ft) close to the south coast. The island is home to Sirocco, an internationally famous kākāpō, a rare species of parrot.

== History and names ==
The island is one of many geographic features in New Zealand to have a dual place name, consisting of the English and Māori names separated by a slash. The English name "Codfish Island" refers to the endemic blue cod.

The island was named Pegasus Island in 1808 by whaler Eber Bunker after sealers had landed there and began European habitation. By 1824 it was known as both Codfish Island and Whenua Hou. The Māori name "Whenua Hou" means "new land". In about 1815 a mixed-race settlement of sealers and Māori women was established there. Responding to concerns and allegations that local Māori women were being harassed by sealers on nearby Stewart Island, the local Ngāi Tahu rangatira, Honekai, designated Whenua Hou as the site of a new mixed race settlement where early Europeans could live with their Māori wives under his protection. This encouraged sealers, such as Thomas Chaseland to move to Whenua Hou, alleviating the issues which their presence had caused on nearby Stewart Island and making Whenua Hou one of the first permanent mixed Māori and European settlements in the region.

The Department of Conservation sought to create a plan to conserve the island's cultural and historic sites. In 2007 an investigation into the history and archaeology of the island was undertaken by Angela Middleton, Ian Smith and Atholl Anderson. Field investigations were carried out over two weeks and included a survey of possible sites of human activity as well as detailed investigations and excavation in Sealers Bay, the only site of human occupation. Evidence of pre-European Māori settlement in the form of stone artefacts and middens containing fish, bird and mammal bones was found. Historic artefacts such as clay pipes, ceramics, metal objects and glass bottles and house sites were also found. Two phases of settlement were determined by radiocarbon dating. The first was from the 13th–15th century, indicating settlement during the Māori occupation of New Zealand, and the second was historic 19th century occupation from about 1800 to 1830.

== Wildlife ==
Codfish Island / Whenua Hou is home to southern short-tailed bats, kākā, fernbirds, red-fronted and yellow-crowned parakeet (both referred to as kākāriki), Pacific black ducks and a recently introduced population of mōhua.

The island has been identified as an Important Bird Area by BirdLife International because of its significance as a breeding site for several species of seabirds, including Fiordland and yellow-eyed penguins, and mottled, Cook's and Whenua Hou diving petrels. Snares Island snipes have been translocated to Whenua Hou.

== Kākāpō ==
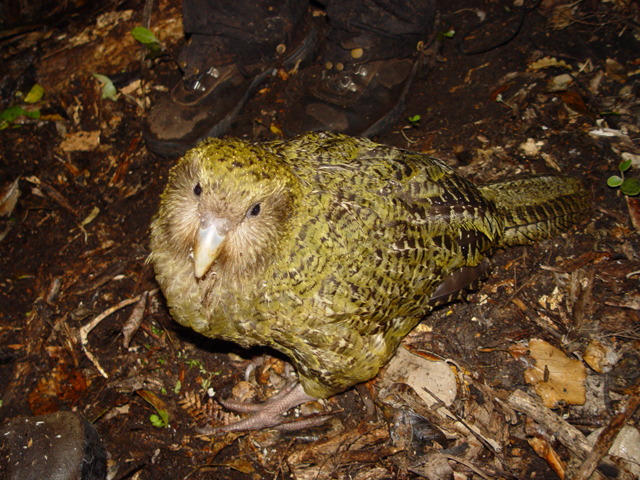
Codfish Island / Whenua Hou is home to about half the world's remaining kākāpō

The first kākāpō were transferred to Codfish Island / Whenua Hou in 1987 from Stewart Island in order to provide a safe haven for the birds. Following the eradication of possums and rats in 1998 and the transfer of weka to other islands, the island became a predator-free bird sanctuary and the focus of kākāpō recovery efforts.

Codfish Island / Whenua Hou provides kākāpō with a home similar to their original home of Rakiura. As it holds the majority of the breeding population of critically endangered kākāpō it has become the centre for kākāpō recovery. In 2002, 24 kākāpō chicks fledged on the island. In 2009 and 2016, 33 and 32 chicks fledged respectively.

Its most famous resident is Sirocco, a kākāpō born in 1997; Sirocco became the government's "Official Spokesbird for Conservation" in 2010. As of September 2021, 75 kākāpō reside on Codfish Island / Whenua Hou including Rakiura, a female born in 2002.

== Access ==
The island is visited by scientific researchers and Department of Conservation field workers along with volunteers working on conservation programmes. The sole hut is located at Sealer's Bay in the northeast, with access by light aircraft or helicopter. The island is closed to casual visitors and unauthorised landing is prohibited.

== See also ==
- List of islands of New Zealand
- New Zealand outlying islands
