= Stephen Fry in America =

2008 British television travel documentary series

- Starring: Stephen Fry
- Narrated by: Stephen Fry
- Country of origin: United Kingdom
- Original language: English
- No. of series: 1
- No. of episodes: 6

Production
- Production location: United States
- Running time: 60 minutes

Original release
- Network: BBC One; BBC Two (repeat)
- Release: 12 October – 16 November 2008

Stephen Fry in America is a six-part BBC television series in which Stephen Fry travels across the United States. In the six-part series he travels, mainly in a London cab, through all 50 of the U.S. states and Washington, D.C.

The episodes are regularly repeated in the UK on Dave. It was aired in the United States on HDNet. In Australia, the program screened on ABC1. The ratings were so successful that the broadcaster decided to finally air Fry's other BBC programme, QI the next month.

The series was filmed in two segments, the first in October–November 2007, and the second in February–April 2008. Special guests featured on the show include Sting, Jimmy Wales, Morgan Freeman, Buddy Guy, and Ted Turner.

== Episode list ==
| No. | Title | States visited | Original release date |
|---|---|---|---|
| 1 | "New World" | Maine, New Hampshire, Vermont, New York, Massachusetts, Connecticut, Rhode Island, New Jersey, Delaware, Maryland, Washington, D.C., and Pennsylvania. | 12 October 2008 |
Fry's journey begins in New England with lobstermen in Eastport, Maine. He attends a primary meeting hosted by Mitt Romney and visits the Mount Washington Hotel in Bretton Woods, New Hampshire, where he rides a cog railway to the top of Mount Washington. In Vermont he is invited to create his own Ben and Jerry's ice cream flavour. He hunts for deer in the Adirondack Mountains (without a gun), attends a tea party with Harvard University professor Peter Gomes, and meets witches in Salem, Massachusetts. Fry tours a submarine at the Naval Submarine Base New London in Groton, Connecticut, visits stately homes in Newport, Rhode Island, and moves on to New York City, meeting cabbies, mobsters, and Sting. Next is Atlantic City, where he apprentices as a croupier at the Trump Taj Mahal casino before crossing the Delaware to Maryland and Washington, D.C. to interview Wikipedia co-founder Jimmy Wales and a member of the Capitol Steps. He ends the first leg of his journey at the Civil War battlefield in Gettysburg, Pennsylvania.
| 2 | "Deep South" | Virginia, West Virginia, Kentucky, Tennessee, North Carolina, South Carolina, Georgia, Florida, and Alabama. | 19 October 2008 |
Fry tries to find out what makes the South so distinctive. He begins this leg of his journey with a visit to Arlington National Cemetery in Virginia. He then finds the Mason–Dixon line, tours a coal mine in West Virginia, and watches horse trading and bourbon brewing before getting a trim at a barber shop in Kentucky. He then visits a body farm in Tennessee, rides in a hot-air balloon in the Great Smoky Mountains, experiences the Gullah culture in the South Carolina Lowcountry, attends a Southern-style Thanksgiving Dinner, tolerates Miami, mingles with snowbirds, and attends a massive college football game in Alabama.
| 3 | "Mississippi" | Louisiana, Arkansas, Mississippi, Missouri, Iowa, Indiana, Ohio, Michigan, Illinois, Wisconsin, and Minnesota. | 26 October 2008 |
A 2,000-mile (3,200 km) journey up the Mississippi River begins in New Orleans during Mardi Gras, followed by a visit to Morgan Freeman's blues club in Mississippi. He hitches a canoe up the river to Arkansas, visits hoboes in St. Louis, gets to see his brainwave activity at the research department of the Maharishi University of Management in Iowa, and after a detour going into a burning building in Indiana and over to Ohio and Detroit, explores Chicago and its place as a center for blues and comedy. He finishes the journey with a sheep's milk cheese farm in Wisconsin and Hmong immigrants and ice fishing in Minnesota.
| 4 | "Mountains and Plains" | Montana, Idaho, Wyoming, North Dakota, South Dakota, Nebraska, Kansas, Colorado, Oklahoma, and Texas. | 2 November 2008 |
National security becomes a recurring theme as Stephen visits Border patrol agents in Montana, a former missile silo in Kansas, and an INS patrol in El Paso. He also visits Glacier National Park, Ted Turner's Bison ranch, the Continental Divide, the German American community in North Dakota, Mount Rushmore and the Crazy Horse Monument, the Lakota people, a major truck stop on Interstate 80, Aspen and Salvation Army work in Oklahoma.
| 5 | "True West" | New Mexico, Utah, Arizona, and Nevada. | 9 November 2008 |
Stephen explores the ancient city of Santa Fe, sees the cutting edge of scientific research in Los Alamos, eats frybread with Navajos in Monument Valley, and hitches a ride with a B-17 Flying Fortress to the 309th Aerospace Maintenance and Regeneration Group. He sees a wild west show in Tucson, takes a houseboat around Lake Powell, takes part in a team-building exercise in Las Vegas, and sees another legacy of the wild west at the Mustang Ranch before arriving at the shores of the Pacific Ocean in San Francisco.
| 6 | "Pacific" | California, Oregon, Washington, Alaska, and Hawaii. | 16 November 2008 |
Stephen begins the final leg of his journey in San Francisco, exploring its Chinatown and meeting Apple executive Jonathan Ive. He takes a ride with the Mendocino County sheriff, meets students at Humboldt State University, explores the forests of Oregon with activists and Bigfoot believers, and reaches the end of the Contiguous United States at a cabaret in Seattle. In Alaska, Stephen encounters fishermen and Inupiat whalers. Finally he goes to Hawaii, where he swims with sharks, meets a real-life Magnum, P.I., attends an authentic luau and finishes his journey at the Hawaiian Volcano Observatory.

== Home media releases ==
The UK home video version was released by West Park Pictures through Lace Digital Media Sales on 17 November 2008. Both the DVD and Blu-ray versions are two-disc sets, complete and uncut. A two-disc Region 1 version was released in the United States in July 2010. In Australia, it was released by Madman Entertainment on two-disc DVD and Blu-ray on 19 August 2009.

== Book ==
A book to accompany the series, also called Stephen Fry in America (ISBN 0061456381), was published by HarperCollins in 2008. In it Stephen writes in more detail about some of his adventures, as well as some of the ones not featured in the show.

== Announced follow-up ==
In May 2008, it was announced that a five-part companion series, More Fry in America, had been commissioned for BBC Four. It was to feature in-depth essays excluded from the first series due to time constraints. No further information about the project has since been released.

== Sequel ==
A four-part sequel series, Stephen Fry in Central America, was broadcast on ITV in the UK from 27 August to 17 September 2015, following Fry travelling through Mexico and the countries of Central America.
