= Hugh Laurie filmography =

Filmography of Hugh Laurie

The English actor Hugh Laurie has appeared extensively in film and television. He made his film debut with the 1985 British film Plenty, and has gone on to appear in movies such as the Stuart Little film franchise and Tomorrowland. Laurie's television roles include House and The Night Manager.

== Filmography ==
=== Film ===
| Year | Title | Role | Notes |
|---|---|---|---|
| 1985 | Plenty | Michael | |
| 1989 | Strapless | Colin | |
| 1992 | Peter's Friends | Roger Charleston | |
| 1994 | A Pin for the Butterfly | Uncle | |
| 1995 | Sense and Sensibility | Mr. Palmer | |
| 1995 | The Snow Queen | Peeps | Voice |
| 1996 | 101 Dalmatians | Jasper Badun | |
| 1996 | The Snow Queen's Revenge | Peeps | Voice |
| 1997 | Spice World | Hercule Poirot | |
| 1997 | The Borrowers | Police Officer Steady | |
| 1997 | The Place of Lions | Steve Harris | |
| 1997 | The Ugly Duckling | Tarquin | Voice |
| 1998 | The Man in the Iron Mask | Pierre | |
| 1998 | Cousin Bette | Baron Hector Hulot | |
| 1999 | Blackadder: Back & Forth | Viscount George Bufton-Tufton / Georgius | |
| 1999 | Stuart Little | Frederick Little | |
| 2000 | Maybe Baby | Sam Bell | |
| 2000 | Carnivale | Cenzo | Voice |
| 2001 | Girl from Rio | Raymond Woods | |
| 2001 | Discovering the Real World of Harry Potter | Narrator | |
| 2001 | Second Star to the Left | Archie | |
| 2002 | Stuart Little 2 | Frederick Little | |
| 2003 | The Young Visiter | Lord Bernard Clark | |
| 2004 | Flight of the Phoenix | Ian | |
| 2005 | The Big Empty | Doctor | |
| 2005 | Valiant | Wing Commander Gutsy | Voice |
| 2006 | Stuart Little 3: Call of the Wild | Frederick Little | Voice |
| 2008 | Street Kings | Captain James Biggs | |
| 2009 | Monsters vs. Aliens | Dr. Herbert Cockroach | Nominated – Annie Award for Voice Acting in a Feature Production |
| 2009 | B.O.B's Big Break | Dr. Herbert Cockroach | Short film |
| 2009 | Monsters vs. Aliens: Mutant Pumpkins from Outer Space | Dr. Herbert Cockroach | Voice |
| 2011 | The Oranges | David Walling | |
| 2011 | Hop | Mr. Bunny | Voice |
| 2011 | Arthur Christmas | Steve | Voice |
| 2012 | Mr. Pip | Mr. Watts | |
| 2015 | Tomorrowland | David Nix | |
| 2018 | Holmes & Watson | Mycroft Holmes | Uncredited Cameo |
| 2019 | The Personal History of David Copperfield | Mr. Dick | |
| 2022 | The Amazing Maurice | Maurice | Voice |
| 2023 | The Canterville Ghost | The Grim Reaper | Voice |

=== Television ===
Key
| † | Denotes television productions that have not yet been released |

| Year | Title | Role | Notes |
|---|---|---|---|
| 1981 | The Cellar Tapes | Various characters | Writer |
| 1982 | There's Nothing to Worry About! | Various characters | Writer |
| 1983 | Alfresco | Various characters | Writer |
| 1983 | The Crystal Cube | Various characters | Writer |
| 1984 | The Young Ones | Lord Monty | Episode: "Bambi" |
| 1985 | Letters from a Bomber Pilot | Pilot Officer Bob Hodgson | |
| 1985 | Mrs. Capper's Birthday | Bobby | |
| 1985 | Happy Families | Jim | |
| 1986 | Blackadder II | Simon Partridge; Prince Ludwig the Indestructible | Episodes: "Beer", "Chains" |
| 1987 | Filthy Rich & Catflap | N'Bend | |
| 1987 | Up Line | Howard Caprice | 3 episodes |
| 1987 | Blackadder the Third | George, Prince of Wales, The Prince Regent | |
| 1988 | Blackadder's Christmas Carol | Prince George,Lord Pigmot | |
| 1989 | Blackadder Goes Forth | Lt. the Honourable George Colhurst St. Barleigh | |
| 1989 | The New Statesman | Waiter | |
| 1989–1995 | A Bit of Fry & Laurie | Various Characters | Writer |
| 1990–1993 | Jeeves and Wooster | Bertie Wooster | |
| 1993 | All or Nothing at All | Leo Hopkins | 3 episodes |
| 1993–1995 | The Legends of Treasure Island | Squire Trelawney | Voice |
| 1995 | The World of Peter Rabbit and Friends | Johnny Town-Mouse (voice) | Episode: "The Tale of Two Bad Mice and Johnny Town-Mouse" |
| 1996 | Tracey Takes On... | Timothy Bugge | 3 episodes |
| 1996 | Murder Most Horrid | Jerry Bryce | Episode: "The Body Politic" |
| 1998 | Friends | Gentleman on the Plane | Episode: "The One with Ross's Wedding (Part 2)" |
| 1998 | The Bill | Defence Counsel | Episode: "Good Faith: Part 1" |
| 1999 | The Nearly Complete and Utter History of Everything | French Ambassador | Sketch: Treaty of Westphalia |
| 2000 | Randall & Hopkirk | Dr. Lawyer | Episode: "Mental Apparition Disorder" |
| 2000 | Preston Pig | Mr. Wolf | Voice |
| 2001 | Life with Judy Garland: Me and My Shadows | Vincente Minnelli | |
| 2001 | Lost in the Snow | Teddy (voice) | |
| 2001, 2010 | Family Guy | Bar Patron, Dr. Gregory House, Himself (voices) | Episodes: "One If by Clam, Two If by Sea", "Business Guy" |
| 2002 | The Strange Case of Penny Allison | Various Characters | |
| 2002 | Spooks | Jools Siviter | |
| 2003 | Fortysomething | Paul Slippery | Also directed three episodes |
| 2003 | Stuart Little | Frederick Little | Voice |
| 2004 | Fire Engine Fred | Narrator | |
| 2004–2012 | House | Gregory House | Lead role, also directed episodes "Lockdown" and "The C-Word" |
| 2006, 2008 | Saturday Night Live | Host | Episodes: "Hugh Laurie/Beck" and "Hugh Laurie/Kanye West" |
| 2010 | The Simpsons | Roger (voice) | Episode: "Treehouse of Horror XXI" |
| 2011 | Later... with Jools Holland | Himself | Guest performance/interview |
| 2015–2019 | Veep | Senator Tom James | Seasons 4–7 |
| 2016–present | The Night Manager | Richard Onslow Roper | Main cast |
| 2016–2017 | Chance | Dr. Eldon Chance | Lead role |
| 2019 | Catch-22 | Major de Coverley | Miniseries |
| 2020–2022 | Avenue 5 | Ryan Clark | Main cast |
| 2020 | Roadkill | Peter Laurence | Miniseries |
| 2022 | Why Didn't They Ask Evans? | Dr. James Nicholson | Main cast, also writer and director |
| 2023 | All the Light We Cannot See | Etienne LeBlanc | Miniseries; 4 episodes |
| 2024–2025 | Tehran | Eric Peterson | Main role (season 3) |
| 2026 | Dig † | Neville | Post-production |
| TBA | The Wanted Man † | Felix Carmichael | Post-production |
| TBA | Legacy of Spies † | Control | Filming |

=== Documentaries ===
| Year | Title |
|---|---|
| 2001 | Baldrick's Video Diary - A Blackadder in the Making |
| 2007 | Stephen Fry: 50 Not Out |
| 2008 | Blackadder Exclusive: The Whole Rotten Saga |
| 2008 | Blackadder's Most Cunning Moments |
| 2008 | Blackadder Rides Again |
| 2010 | Fry and Laurie Reunited |
| 2011 | Down by the River |
| 2012 | Jools Holland: My Life in Music |
| 2013 | Bayou Maharajah |
| 2013 | Copper Bottom Blues |
| 2015 | A Life On Screen: Stephen Fry |

=== Video games ===
| Year | Title | Role | Notes |
|---|---|---|---|
| 2010 | House M.D.: The Official Game | Dr. Gregory House | |
| 2014 | LittleBigPlanet 3 | Newton | |

=== Radio ===
| Year | Title | Role | Notes |
|---|---|---|---|
| 2023 | People Who Knew Me | N/A | Audio drama |

=== Audiobooks ===
| Year | Title | Role | Notes |
|---|---|---|---|
| 2025—2026 | Harry Potter: The Full-Cast Audio Editions | Albus Dumbledore | Audiobook series |
