= Fry and Laurie =

British comedy duo

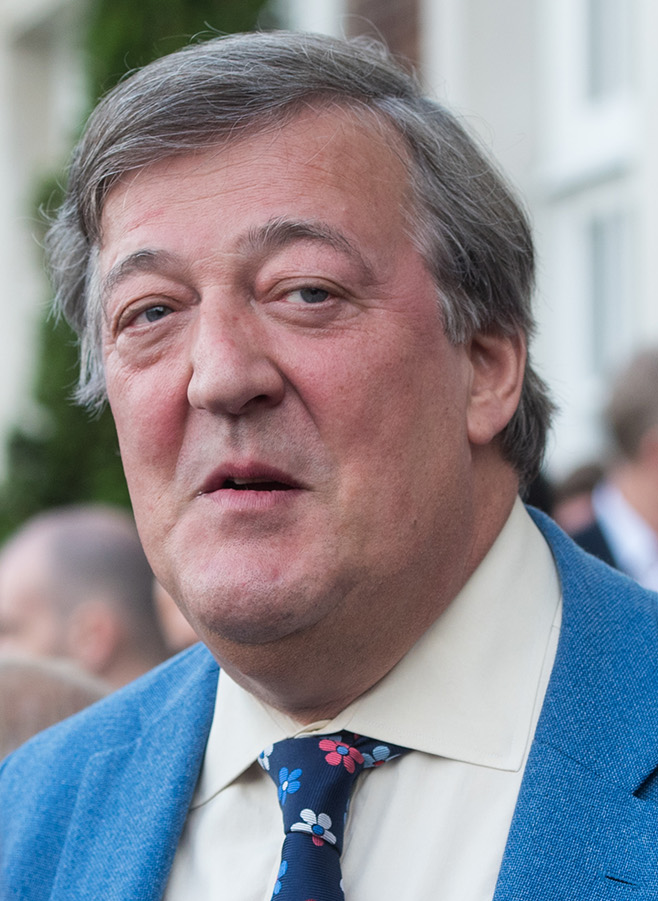

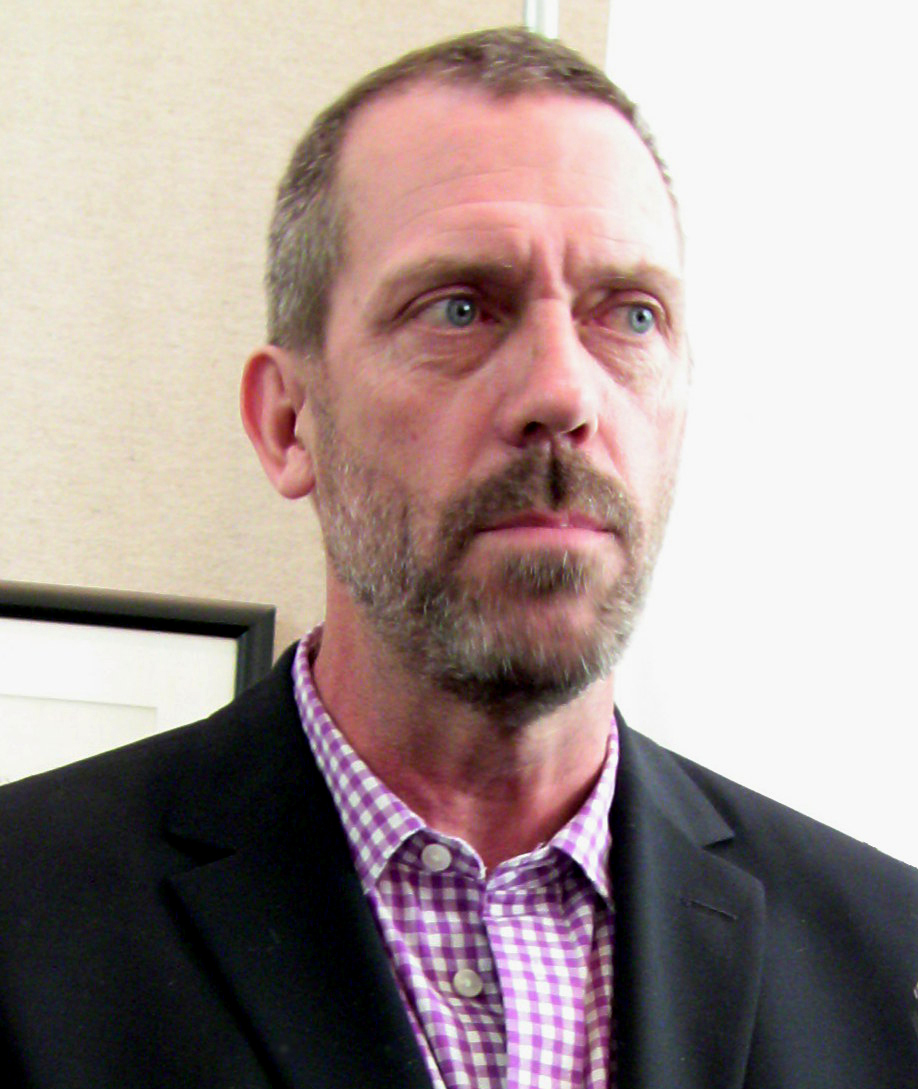
Stephen Fry (left, 2016) and Hugh Laurie (right, 2009)
- Notable work: A Bit of Fry & Laurie; Jeeves and Wooster; Blackadder

Comedy career
- Years active: 1981–2003; 2010–2014 (intermittent since early 1990s)
- Medium: Film, radio, television
- Genres: Character comedy Sketch comedy Slapstick
- Subjects: British culture British politics Class relations

Fry and Laurie are an English comedy double act, mostly active in the 1980s and 1990s, composed of Stephen Fry and Hugh Laurie. The two met in 1980 through mutual friend Emma Thompson while all three attended the University of Cambridge. Following appearances on TV sketch show Alfresco, The Young Ones, and revue series Saturday Live, they gained prominence on television sketch comedy A Bit of Fry & Laurie (1987–1995), actress Deborah Norton appearing in many of the sketches in the first series.

Fry and Laurie have collaborated on numerous other projects including, most notably, the television series Jeeves and Wooster (1990–1993), in which they portrayed P. G. Wodehouse's literary characters Jeeves (Fry) and Wooster (Laurie).

Since the conclusion of A Bit of Fry & Laurie, both have gone on to solo careers in acting, writing and other roles. They reunited for a retrospective show in 2010 titled Fry and Laurie Reunited. On 14 May 2012, Fry announced he and Laurie were working together on a new project, which came to be an animated adaption of Oscar Wilde's 1887 story "The Canterville Ghost". The film was released on October 20, 2023, and features Freddie Highmore as The Duke of Cheshire alongside Fry as Sir Simon de Canterville and Laurie as the Grim Reaper.

Fry and Laurie have remained close friends throughout their careers. Laurie frequently thanks Fry when accepting awards, including at the 2007 Golden Globes when he referred to his former comedy partner, in the old A Bit of Fry and Laurie style, as "m’colleague Stephen Fry". Similarly, Fry has referred to Laurie as "m'colleague" or "m'coll" in the dedications of some of his books.

== Collaborations ==
=== Television programmes ===
- Cambridge Footlights Revue (1981) (BBC2)
- There's Nothing to Worry About! (1982)
- Alfresco (1983) (ITV)
- The Crystal Cube (1983) (BBC2)
- The Young Ones (1984) (BBC2) (appearing in the episode "Bambi")
- Weekend in Wallop (1984) (ITV)
- Saturday Live (1986) (C4)
- Blackadder II (1986) (BBC1) (two episodes together)
- Filthy Rich & Catflap (1987) (BBC2) (appearing in the second episode)
- First Aids (1987) (ITV)
- Blackadder the Third (1987) (BBC1) (one episode together)
- The Secret Policeman's Third Ball (1987) (ITV)
- A Bit of Fry & Laurie (1987 pilot, 1989, 1990, 1992, 1995) (BBC2, BBC1)
- Hysteria! Hysteria! Hysteria! (1988)
- Nelson Mandela 70th Birthday Tribute (1988)
- Blackadder's Christmas Carol (1988) (BBC1)
- The New Statesman (appearing in the episode "The Haltemprice Bunker") (1989)
- A Night of Comic Relief 2 (1989) (BBC1)
- Blackadder Goes Forth (1989) (BBC1)
- The Secret Policeman's Biggest Ball (1989) (ITV)
- Hysteria 2 (1989) (C4)
- Jeeves and Wooster (1990–93) (ITV)
- Comic Relief - 1991 (1991) (BBC1)
- Hysteria III (1991) (C4)
- James Randi: Psychic Investigator (1991) (ITV)
- Fry and Laurie Host A Christmas Night with the Stars (1994) (BBC2)
- Live from the Lighthouse (1998)
- The Nearly Complete And Utter History of Everything (2000) (BBC1)
- Blackadder: Back & Forth (1999) (Sky One)
- Fortysomething (2003) (one show together)
- QI (2003) (BBC2) (one episode together)
- Fry and Laurie Reunited (2010) (Gold)

=== Films ===
- Peter's Friends (1992)
- Spice World (1997) (cameos)
- The Canterville Ghost (2023)

=== Radio shows ===
- Saturday Night Fry on BBC Radio 4 in 1988 (five shows together)
- Whose Line Is It Anyway? on BBC Radio 4 in 1988 (one show together)

=== Published materials ===
Published television scripts

- A Bit of Fry & Laurie (1990)
- A Bit More Fry & Laurie (1991)
- 3 Bits of Fry & Laurie (1992)
- Fry & Laurie Bit No. 4 (1995)

=== Video games ===
- LittleBigPlanet 3 (2014)

=== Miscellaneous ===
Fry and Laurie have also appeared together in various television advertisements (notably a long running series of commercials for the Alliance & Leicester building society from the late 1980s to the early 1990s), interviews, audio books, and other projects.
