= The Crystal Cube =

- Genre: Mockumentary
- Created by: Stephen Fry; Hugh Laurie
- Directed by: John Kilby
- Starring: Stephen Fry; Hugh Laurie; Emma Thompson; Robbie Coltrane; John Savident; Arthur Bostrom; Roy Heather; Paul Shearer; Fanny Carby
- Country of origin: United Kingdom
- No. of seasons: 1
- No. of episodes: 1

Production
- Running time: 30 minutes

Original release
- Network: BBC2
- Release: 7 July 1983

Related
- Alfresco; A Bit of Fry and Laurie

The Crystal Cube is a mockumentary television pilot written by and starring Stephen Fry and Hugh Laurie, broadcast on 7 July 1983 on BBC2 at 22:10. The pilot was one of Fry and Laurie's first television appearances and the first show they had written themselves. However, the BBC chose not to take it to a full series, and Fry and Laurie did not get a chance to make their own programme for the BBC until 1989, when they produced their first full series of the more conventional sketch show A Bit of Fry and Laurie, after a pilot in 1987.

== Plot ==
The Crystal Cube was a spoof science programme, based on shows such as Tomorrow's World. The show was hosted by Jackie Meld (Emma Thompson). In each episode, a different topic of science was to be discussed. In the pilot, it was genetics. Two guest scientists discussed the issue of genetics to a live studio audience and viewers at home. The scientists were Dr. Adrian Cowlacey (Fry), a practicing clinician at St. Thomas' Hospital, London, and Max Belhaven (Laurie) of the Bastard Institute in California. Cowlacey and Belhaven commented positively on the prospects that in the future, society would be divided into a genetic caste system with people divided into "Alphas", "Betas" and "Gammas" based on their genetic background (terminology used in Huxley's Brave New World). They also showed an example of a genetically engineered human, Gareth Gamma 0001 (Arthur Bostrom), who was designed to carry out menial tasks without complaint. The show later went into a debate between a member of clergy, The Bishop of Horley, The Very Reverend Previous Lockhort (John Savident) and Martin Bealey (Robbie Coltrane), an anti-communist journalist who claimed the Soviets were using genetics to invade Britain. However, Gareth interrupted the conversations and caused a riot. Cowlacey therefore was forced to end the show.

== Cast ==
- Stephen Fry as Dr. Adrian Cowlacey / Various Roles
- Hugh Laurie as Max Belhaven / Various Roles
- Emma Thompson as Jackie Meld / Various roles
- Robbie Coltrane as Martin Bealey
- Fanny Carby as Gareth's Mother, Mrs. 0001
- Arthur Bostrom as Gareth, Gamma 0001
- Roy Heather as Gareth's Father, Mr. 0001
- John Savident as The Bishop of Horley, The Very Reverend Previous Lockhort
- Paul Shearer as Mike Liam

== Production ==
The Crystal Cube was designed by the BBC to provide a pilot for Fry and Laurie, who after working in the ITV comedy series Alfresco were beginning to be seen as a double act. The show involves several members of the Alfresco cast, such as Thompson and Coltrane.

== Reception ==
The BBC were not expecting that the show Fry and Laurie made would combine elements of science fiction and mockumentary, and as a result, the pilot was not commissioned into a series. Fry and Laurie did make later appearances in other BBC comedy shows such as The Young Ones and Blackadder. The BBC later gave Fry and Laurie a second opportunity and this resulted in A Bit of Fry and Laurie, first broadcast in 1987.

One joke from The Crystal Cube is reused in A Bit of Fry and Laurie. In The Crystal Cube, Harris Edgley-Woad, a fictional early genetics pioneer, was said to have been born in a working-class home that his parents had built for him in the grounds of their Gloucestershire estate. This joke reappears in the last episode of the second series of A Bit of Fry and Laurie, but instead it is Laurie who was born in such a house.
