= List of A Bit of Fry & Laurie episodes =

A Bit of Fry & Laurie was a British television sketch comedy show, starring and written by Stephen Fry and Hugh Laurie, broadcast by the BBC between 1989 and 1995. Running for four series, it totalled 26 episodes (including a 36-minute special in 1987).

The following is a list of episodes of the programme and the sketches in each one, omitting the short "vox pops" interstitial segments between sketches.

== Pilot (26 December 1987) ==
- Customs Camera
- Holiday Photographs
- Problems around the Eye Area
- The Privatisation of the Police Force
- Critics ("Argue the Toss", "Up the Arts", "Oh No, Not Another One")
- Deodorant - William Wegman from "Selected Video Works 1970-78"
- "How Lovely I Was"
- Soup/Suit
- Mystery (song)
- You Can't Make an Omelette without Breaking Eggs (1st Gordon & Stuart)
- The word, "Gay"
- Toy Car Showroom
- Tales of War
- Australian Soap Opera

== Series 1 (1989) ==
Opening: A short "vox pops" sequence followed by photographs being laid out and gathered up again, accompanied by an upbeat piano/whistling theme

Closing: More photographs (for all except Episodes 1 and 6) and the same theme.

Episode 1 (13 January 1989)

- Parent Power
- Hugh's Poem
- Young People
- SAS
- The West Indies: A Nation of Cricketers
- Spoonbending with Mr Nude
- Censored
- Haircut

Episode 2 (20 January 1989)

- Information
- Sound Name (Derek Nippl-e)
- Language Conversation (Continued in Series Two's "Beauty and Ideas")
- America (song)
- Chatshow
- Spies One (1st Control & Tony)
- Beggar
- Hand Exercise
- Troubleshooters (1st John & Peter)

Episode 3 (27 January 1989)

- Hugh's Brain
- Gordon and Stuart Eat Greek (2nd Gordon & Stuart)
- Costume Design
- Doctor Tobacco
- Open University
- Spies Two (2nd Control & Tony)
- Special Squad

Episode 4 (3 February 1989)

- Trouser-Competition Introduction
- Prize Poem
- Awful Smell (Stole My Sketch 1)
- Madness
- Antique Shop (Stole My Sketch 2)
- Spies Three (3rd Control & Tony)
- Light Metal (The Bishop & The Warlord) (song)
- Bank Loan
- Nipples
- Inspector Venice (Stole My Sketch 3)
- Tomorrow's World

Episode 5 (10 February 1989)

- Lavatories
- Critics One
- Judge Not
- Critics Four
- Ignored Teacher
- That's It (Silhouettes 1)
- Hugh's Favourite Sketch
- Critics (heavily edited mixture between Critics Two)
- The "Burt"
- Christening
- Swiss Comedy (Heidi and Johann Smell Just Right)

Episode 6 (17 February 1989)

- Marjorie's Fall
- Puppy Appeal
- Leave It Out (Silhouettes 2)
- Girlfriend's Breasts
- Spies Four (4th Control & Tony)
- Violence
- Chicken
- Cocoa
- Tony of Plymouth (Sword Fight)

== Series 2 (1990) ==
The cover of the DVD release for the second series of "A Bit of Fry & Laurie"

Opening: Clips of Fry and Laurie engaging in various activities around London, accompanied by a jazzy theme

Closing: The Finale movement from The Carnival of the Animals by Camille Saint-Saëns, performed on a player piano

Episode 1 (9 March 1990)

- Time Where Did You Go (Introduction/Dancercises)
- Flushed Grollings
- Dammit 1 (2nd John & Peter)
- Fast Talker
- Grandfather's Things
- Psychiatrist
- Commentators
- Spies/Pulse (5th Control & Tony)
- "Michael Jackson" performing Move It On Out Girl

Episode 2 (16 March 1990)

- Tideymans Carpets Introduction/The Spillage That Wasn't (Tideymans)
- Spies/Pigeons (6th Control & Tony)
- Trick or Treat (Tideymans)
- Play It Again, Sam
- Major Donaldson
- Dammit 2 (3rd John & Peter) (Tideymans)
- "Improvised" Sketch/First Lines (Tideymans)

Episode 3 (23 March 1990)

- Swearing
- Witness
- Over to You
- Jewellery
- Hugh's Girlfriends
- Mystery Objects
- Society
- Dammit 4 (4th John & Peter)
- Bottom Fondling

Episode 4 (30 March 1990)

- "Big" Introduction
- Dinner With Digby
- Returning suits
- Hard Man's Record (1st Alan)
- Small Talk
- Dammit Lavatories (5th John & Peter)
- The Robert Robinsons
- Spies/Telescope (7th Control & Tony)
- Stephen and Hugh become big/"A Bit of Little & Large"

Episode 5 (6 April 1990)

- MBE Introduction
- This is Dominic Appleguard
- Rhodes Boysons
- Amputated Genitals
- The Cause (1st Jack & Freddy/Neddy) (3rd Gordon & Stuart)
- Where Eagles Dare

Episode 6 (13 April 1990)

- Satire/Tribute ("Where is the Lid?" song)
- Yellow Pages
- Beauty and Ideas (Continued from Series One's "Language Conversation")
- Anarchy
- Dammit Church (6th John & Peter)
- First Kiss
- Borrowing A Fiver Off
- Spies/Firing (8th Control & Tony)
- Introducing My Grandfather To...
- A Vision of Britain
- Wrong Directions (follows the end credits)

== Series 3 (1992) ==
Opening: Silhouettes of Fry and Laurie dancing against a backdrop of palm trees and being blasted off the screen, accompanied by a mariachi-style theme

Closing: A 12-bar blues performed live on piano by Laurie, who also mimics a trumpet solo as Fry mixes the featured cocktail of the episode

Episode 1 (9 January 1992)

- A Word, Timothy
- Very Upset
- Love Me Tender (song) (serenading Nicholas Parsons)
- Milk Pot
- The Department (2nd Alan)
- Stephen's Song (song)
- Psychiatrists
- Cocktail Ending: Whiskey Thunder

Episode 2 (16 January 1992)

- Condom Quickie
- Embassy
- Ampersands
- Duel
- There Ain't But One Way (Kickin' Ass) Song (song)
- Petrol Attendants
- Jobs
- European Deal
- Cocktail Ending: Slow Snog with a Distant Relative

Episode 3 (23 January 1992)

- We Haven't Met
- Names
- The Other Department (3rd Alan)
- Hey Jude (song)
- The Day I Forgot My Legs
- Firing
- Question of Sport
- Balloon-o!
- Shoe Shop (1st Mr Dalliard)
- Cocktail Ending: Everything in the Till and No Sudden Moves

The 'Hey Jude' sketch was not included on the Region 1 DVD release due to rights restrictions. The sketch remained intact on the Region 2 DVD, as well as on the streaming services Netflix and BritBox.

Episode 4 (30 January 1992)

- Get Well Card
- "Photocopying My Genitals With ..."
- My Ass
- My Ass Critique
- News Report
- Patriotism
- AA
- Marmalade
- Too Long, Johnny (song)
- The Red Hat of Patferrick (1st Gelliant Gutfright)
- Cocktail Ending: A Mug of Horlicks

Episode 5 (6 February 1992)

- Balls
- Soup or Broth
- Mental Health
- World Sport: Bushwallyta
- Spaghetti
- Aromusician
- Countdown to Hell
- The New Cause (2nd Jack & Freddy/Neddy)
- Neddy PM (3rd Jack & Freddy/Neddy)
- Cocktail Ending: Beef Goulash

Episode 6 (13 February 1992)

- Magazine Leaflets
- My Dear Boy
- Joke Shop
- Horrormen
- Tahitian Kitchen
- My Favourite Pants
- Devil's Music (The Bishop and the Warlord)
- Flying a Light Aircraft with ...
- Cocktail Ending: Berliner Credit Sequence

== Series 4 (1995) ==
Opening: A narrative whispered by Fry and punctuated with interjections by Laurie, played over a subdued melody and jittery black-and-white clips of the two on a beach, in a parody of a Calvin Klein perfume commercial

Closing: Same as Series 3

Episode 1 (12 February 1995)

Guests: John Bird, Jane Booker

Sketches:

- Grey and Hopeless
- Guests Introduction
- Blame
- Charter
- Jane's Poem (NOTE: Script appeared in first script book as Stephen's Poem, but the poem is the same, except the line about his wife dying is changed to Jane's grandfather being murdered.)
- Smell
- All We Gotta' Do (song; Laurie performed this song when he hosted "Saturday Night Live" in 2006)
- Channel Changer
- Wonderful Life
- Cocktail Ending: Golden Meteorite

Episode 2 (19 February 1995)

Guests: Fiona Gillies, Kevin McNally

Sketches:

- Dog Hamper
- Hugh's Bandage
- Child Abuse
- Guests Introduction
- Going for Gold
- I'm in love with Steffi Graf (song)
- Lovers' Helper
- Fascion
- Avenger
- Operational Criteria
- Cocktail Ending: Long, Confident Suck

Episode 3 (26 February 1995)

Guests: Imelda Staunton, Clive Mantle

Sketches:

- Vox Pops
- Guests Introduction
- Barman
- Interruptus
- Little Girl (song)
- Making Tea
- For Some Reason Angry
- Don't Be Dirty
- Cocktail Ending: South Seas Vulvic Wart

Episode 4 (5 March 1995)

Guests: Caroline Quentin, Patrick Barlow

Sketches:

- Good Evening
- Guests Introduction
- Football School
- Dalliard: Models
- Hugh Interviewing Guests
- The Polite Rap (song)
- Head Gardener
- Gelliant Gutfright ("Flowers For Wendy")
- Cocktail Ending: A Quick One With You, Stephen

Episode 5 (19 March 1995)

Guests: Phyllida Law, Stephen Moore

Sketches:

- Oprah Winfrey
- Guests Introduction
- Grand Prix
- Tribunal
- Red and Shiny
- Pooch
- Disgusting
- Wasps
- Cocktail Ending: Swinging Ballsack

Episode 6 (26 March 1995)

Guests: None

Sketches:

- Stolen Money
- Young Tory of the Year
- Variety
- Gossiping Heads
- Death Threat
- What I Mind (Misunderstood) (song)
- Honda
- The Duke of Northampton
- Cocktail Ending: Silver Prostate

Episode 7 (2 April 1995)

Guests: Janine Duvitski, Robert Daws

Sketches:

- Guests Introduction
- Religianto
- Consent
- Tiny Wife - similar to Father Ted's "small but far away"
- Sophisticated Song (song)
- Fast Monologue
- Telephone Alert
- Truancy
- Cocktail Ending: A Modern Britain (with Daws playing both the "Last Post" bugle call and Laurie's mimicked horn solo on trumpet)
