= John Savident =

British actor (1937–2024)

- Savident as Fred Elliott from the ITV soap opera Coronation Street
- Born: John Frederick Joseph Savident; 21 January 1938; Saint Peter Port, Guernsey, Channel Islands
- Died: 21 February 2024 (aged 86); Hillingdon, London, England
- Occupation: Actor
- Years active: 1967–2012
- Known for: Role of Fred Elliott in Coronation Street (1994–2006)
- Spouse: Rona Hopkinson (m. 1961)
- Children: 2

John Frederick Joseph Savident (21 January 1938 – 21 February 2024) was a British actor, known for his numerous television roles, including his portrayal of butcher Fred Elliott in the soap opera Coronation Street from 1994-2006. He was also known for his performance as Monsieur Firmin in the West End cast of The Phantom of the Opera. He was in the episode The Double Death of Charlie Crippen in the spy-fi series Department S (1968). His other credits include The Avengers (1968), A Clockwork Orange (1971), The Professionals (1978), Blake's 7 (1979), Yes Minister (1980), Gandhi (1982), The Remains of the Day (1993) and Middlemarch (1994).

== Early life ==
Savident was born 21 January 1938 in Saint Peter Port, Guernsey, and still lived there at the time of the German occupation of the island in 1940. He and his family escaped to Britain in a fishing boat and settled in Ashton-under-Lyne. His acting career started when he joined Ashton Repertory.

Savident was educated at the town's grammar school and in 1955 joined the Manchester City Police, serving as a police officer before turning to acting as his profession.

== Career ==
Savident created the role of Monsieur Firmin in the original production of Phantom of the Opera, which opened on 9 October 1986 at Her Majesty's Theatre in Haymarket, London. He appeared as the renegade scientist Egrorian in a 1981 episode of the cult science fiction TV series Blake's 7. He also had other television appearances in Danger Man, The Saint, Callan and Doctor Who. He played Doctor Meredith in The Remains of the Day.

=== Coronation Street ===
Despite his many film and television roles, including civil servant Sir Frederick Stewart in Yes Minister, and a part in A Clockwork Orange (1971), it was only when Savident joined the cast of Coronation Street as the bellicose but romantic butcher Fred Elliott during the 1990s that he became a household name. He made his first appearance on the show in 1994 and his character quickly became popular with viewers.

In December 2005, Savident announced that he was to leave Coronation Street citing undisclosed "personal reasons". His character died of a stroke nine months later, in October 2006. He later revealed that he had retired from the show "because he wanted to spend more time with his family in Hertfordshire".

=== Later work ===
Savident was one of the readers on the BBC's online Advent Calendar in December 2006. That year, he appeared in the pantomime Snow White and the Seven Dwarfs as the henchman at Manchester Opera House, alongside his former Coronation Street co-star Suranne Jones, as well as Justin Moorhouse and an all-star seven dwarves including Warwick Davis.

In 2007, he was touring as the lead in a production of Hobson's Choice. He appeared on Loose Women on 19 March 2009 to discuss his part as Sir Joseph Porter in the Gilbert and Sullivan operetta HMS Pinafore, which toured the United Kingdom during the spring and summer of 2009.

He guest-starred in the Christmas special episode of Holby City in 2012, playing patient Rupert Pool. He voiced the character Pendle in the Doctor Who audio-drama Order of the Daleks.

== Personal life and death ==
Savident married Rona Hopkinson in 1961; they had two children.

In the early hours of 1 December 2000, Savident was stabbed in the neck at his flat in Manchester by Michael Smith. He had met Smith at a gay bar that evening. Smith was jailed for seven years for the attack.

Savident died on 21 February 2024, aged 86.

== Filmography ==
- Robbery (1967) – Policeman with Dog (uncredited)
- The White Bus (1967) – Supporter
- Armchair Theatre: Compensation Alice (1967) – Cecil
- The Saint (1968) – Frank Lomax
- The Avengers (1968) – Henry Winthrop
- Inadmissible Evidence (1968) – Mr. Watson
- Department S (1968) – Captain Svenoski
- Nearest and Dearest (1969) – Landlord
- Otley (1969) – Businessman
- Before Winter Comes (1969) – British Corporal
- Battle of Britain (1969) – RAF Officer (uncredited)
- Codename (1970) – Largo (Episode: The Alpha Men"}
- Waterloo (1970) – Muffling
- A Family at War (1970–1972, TV series) – George Askew
- Doomwatch (1971) – Minister of Health (Episode: "The Web of Fear")
- The Raging Moon (1971) – Fete Guest
- A Clockwork Orange (1971) – Conspirator Dolin
- Man of Straw (1972, TV series) – Von Wulchow
- Tightrope (1972) – Forrester
- Penny Gold (1973) – Sir Robert Hampton
- Hitler: The Last Ten Days (1973) – Hewel
- Diamonds on Wheels (1974) – Steward
- Butley (1974) – James (uncredited)
- QB VII (1974) – Anaesthetist
- Galileo (1974) – Second Senator
- Looking For Clancy (1975) – Sir John Kernan
- Trial by Combat (1976) – Oliver Griggs – Police Commissioner
- Raffles (1976) (plus TV series The Manhunt) Mr. Justice Raffles – Daniel Brigstock (1 episode)
- Just William (1977 TV series) (1977) – Mr. Bumbleby (Series 2, Episode 14 – "William and the Tramp")
- Rachel and the Beelzebub Bombardiers (1977) – Captain Verney, MP
- 1990 (1977) – Dan Mellor
- The Professionals (1978) – Robert Plumb (1 episode)
- Blake's 7 (1979) – Samor
- Yes Minister (1980) – Sir Frederick "Jumbo" Stewart
- Blake's 7 (1981) – Egrorian
- Doctor Who: The Visitation (1982) – The Squire (1 episode)
- Gandhi (1982) – Manager of the Mine
- Blackadder (pilot) (1982) – King of England
- Oliver Twist (1982, TV Movie) – Mr. Fang
- The Wicked Lady (1983) – Squire Thornton
- The Crystal Cube (1983) – The Bishop of Horley
- The Cleopatras (1983) – Pythagoras
- Never the Twain (1984) – Series 3 Episode 2, Mr Wilde
- The Bill (1984, TV series) – Video shop owner
- Little Dorrit (1987) – Tite Barnacle
- A Summer Story (1988) – A Bank Clerk
- Camping (1990) – English camper
- Mountains of the Moon (1990) – Lord Murchison
- Impromptu (1991) – Buloz
- Hudson Hawk (1991) – Auctioneer
- Mr. Bean Takes an Exam (1991) – examination invigilator
- Jeeves and Wooster (1992) (TV series) Series 3, Episode 2 – Edgar Gascoyne Bickersteth, 8th Duke of Chiswick
- Brain Donors (1992) – Edmund Lazlo
- Mrs 'Arris Goes to Paris (1992) – Mr Armont
- The Remains of the Day (1993) – Doctor Meredith
- Tom & Viv (1994) – Sir Frederick Lamb
- Coronation Street (1994–2006) – Fred Elliott (1,065 episodes)
- Middlemarch (1994) – Raffles
- Othello (1995) – 2nd Senator
- Loch Ness (1996) – Dr. Binns
- Sharpe – Sharpe's Regiment (1996) – Maj. Gen. Sir Barstan Maxwell
- Hotel Babylon (2009) – Tristam Calder
- The Phantom of the Opera at the Royal Albert Hall (2011) – Monsieur Firmin
- Holby City (2012) – Rupert Pool
