= There's Nothing to Worry About! =

British television series

There's Nothing to Worry About! is a British television series that ran on ITV Granada in 1982. The sketch comedy show was the first screen collaboration between the comedy duo Fry and Laurie (Stephen Fry and Hugh Laurie). Other cast members include Emma Thompson, Ben Elton, Paul Shearer and Siobhan Redmond.

The show was designed by ITV as an answer to the popular BBC series Not the Nine O'Clock News. Rik Mayall was initially approached to star, but he dropped out. Three episodes of the show were produced and it was only broadcast in Granada Television's ITV region (North West England). The same cast was then used for the sketch show Alfresco (1983–4), albeit with Shearer replaced by Robbie Coltrane, which ran for two series nationwide. There's Nothing to Worry About effectively worked as a pilot for Alfresco and several sketches from the former were reproduced in the latter.
