= Didn't It Rain (Hugh Laurie album) =

Studio album by Hugh Laurie
- Released: 6 August 2013
- Recorded: 7–12 and 28–30 January 2013
- Studio: Ocean Way (Hollywood)
- Genres: Blues; tango
- Length: 52:45; 56:26 (iTunes edition); 71:05 (Amazon Special edition)
- Label: Warner Bros./Rhino
- Producer: Joe Henry

Hugh Laurie chronology
| Let Them Talk (2011) | Didn't It Rain (2013) |

Singles from Didn't It Rain
- 1. "Wild Honey" Released: 2013

Professional ratings
Aggregate scores
| Source | Rating |
|---|---|
| Metacritic | 63/100 |
Review scores
| Source | Rating |
| AllMusic | 3/5 stars |
| BPM | 62% |
| PopMatters | 7/10 |

Didn't It Rain is the second studio album by English actor and musician Hugh Laurie.

Recorded in Ocean Way Studios in Los Angeles in January 2013, the album contains several blues songs (like its predecessor, Let Them Talk). Unlike his previous album, however, Laurie also branches further into other Southern US and South American genres, including blues and tango.

Similarly to Let Them Talk, Laurie once again plays piano and guitar, and often provides vocals. Additionally, Laurie is joined by guest musicians Gaby Moreno, Jean McClain, and Taj Mahal, and is supported throughout by the Copper Bottom Band.

Didn't It Rain was released in the UK on 6 May 2013, with iTunes providing pre-order and digital releases, and Amazon providing vinyl prints and a special book edition. As a promotion for a Huffington Post interview regarding Laurie's album and upcoming tour, the album had a 24-hour free streaming period in several countries. It was released in the United States on 6 August 2013.

The miniature piano seen on the album artwork was given to Laurie on a 2009 episode of Friday Night with Jonathan Ross.

== Track listing ==
| No. | Title | Writer(s) | Length |
|---|---|---|---|
| 1. | "The St. Louis Blues" | WC Handy | 4:21 |
| 2. | "Junkers Blues" | William Jack Dupree | 2:55 |
| 3. | "Kiss of Fire" | Lester Allen, Robert Hill (original by Arroyo y Villodo) | 3:27 |
| 4. | "Vicksburg Blues" | Little Brother Montgomery | 4:28 |
| 5. | "The Weed Smoker's Dream" | Joe McCoy | 4:17 |
| 6. | "Wild Honey" | Robert Charles Guidry, Malcolm John Rebennack | 4:20 |
| 7. | "Send Me to the 'Lectric Chair" | George Brooks | 5:26 |
| 8. | "Evenin'" | Harry A. White, Mitchell Parish | 3:03 |
| 9. | "Didn't It Rain" | Robert S.H. Martin, Traditional | 2:52 |
| 10. | "Careless Love" | Martin E. Koenig, Spencer Williams | 5:21 |
| 11. | "One for My Baby" | John H. Mercer, Harold Arlen | 4:00 |
| 12. | "I Hate a Man Like You" | Joseph Ferdinand Morton | 4:17 |
| 13. | "Changes" | Alan Price | 3:58 |

iTunes bonus track
| No. | Title | Writer(s) | Length |
|---|---|---|---|
| 14. | "Unchain My Heart" | Bobby Sharp, Teddy Powell | 3:41 |

Limited edition book pack disc 2
| No. | Title | Writer(s) | Length |
|---|---|---|---|
| 1. | "Day & Night" | Rudy Stevenson | 3:07 |
| 2. | "Junco Partner" | Robert Ellen | 4:21 |
| 3. | "Louisiana Blues" | Muddy Waters | 3:24 |
| 4. | "Staggerlee" | Lloyd Price, Harold Logan, Traditional | 3:47 |
| 5. | "Unchain My Heart" | Bobby Sharp, Teddy Powell | 3:41 |

== Personnel ==
- Greg Leisz – acoustic guitar, electric guitar, lap steel guitar, dobro, mandola, mandolin
- Patrick Warren – accordion, Hammond b-3 organ, pump organ, keyboards
- Vincent Henry – vocals, harmonica, clarinet, bass clarinet, soprano saxophone, tenor saxophone, baritone saxophone
- Jay Bellerose – drums, percussion
- Larry Goldings – Hammond b-3 organ
- Kevin Breit – acoustic guitar, electric guitar, lap steel guitar, tenor banjo, mandocello, mandola, mandolin, background vocals
- Jean McClain – backing vocals
- Elizabeth Lea – trombone
- David Plitch – upright bass, electric bass
- Hugh Laurie – vocals, acoustic guitar, whistle, piano, Wurlitzer organ
- Robby Marshall – clarinet, bass clarinet, alto saxophone, tenor saxophone

Also

- Taj Mahal
- Gaby Moreno

== Tour ==
Following the album's release, a promotional tour was set to span the UK and several countries starting on 31 May 2013. The tour began in Belarus, and continued across mainland Europe. After covering five EU capitals, it toured several cities in the United Kingdom, before concluding back in mainland Europe.

| Date | City | Country | Venue |
Mainland Europe
| 31 May 2013 | Minsk | Belarus | Republic Palace |
| 2 June 2013 | Saint Petersburg | Russia | Oktyabrsky Grand Concert Hall |
| 4 June 2013 | Moscow | Russia | Kremlin Palace |
| 6 June 2013 | Warsaw | Poland | Congress Hall |
| 7 June 2013 | Berlin | Germany | Admiralspalast |
| 9 June 2013 | Luxembourg City | Luxembourg | Den Atelier |
| 10 June 2013 | Amsterdam | Netherlands | Concertgebouw |
| 11 June 2013 | Brussels | Belgium | Cirque Royal |
United Kingdom
| 13 June 2013 | Bristol | England | Colston Hall |
| 14 June 2013 | London | England | Hammersmith Apollo |
| 15 June 2013 | Oxford | England | New Theatre Oxford |
| 17 June 2013 | Brighton | England | Brighton Dome |
| 18 June 2013 | Birmingham | England | Symphony Hall |
| 20 June 2013 | Manchester | England | Apollo Manchester |
| 22 June 2013 | Edinburgh | Scotland | Edinburgh Playhouse |
| 23 June 2013 | Gateshead | England | The Sage |
Mainland Europe
| 9 July 2013 | Paris | France | Le Grand Rex |
| 12 July 2013 | Bucharest | Romania | Sala Palatului |
| 14 July 2013 | Zurich | Switzerland | Live At Sunset |
| 15 July 2013 | Bologna | Italy | Teatro Auditorium Manzoni |
| 18 July 2013 | Arles | France | Theatre Antique d’Arles |
| 23 July 2013 | Vienna | Austria | Konzerthaus |
| 24 July 2013 | Ljubljana | Slovenia | Križanke |
| 26 July 2013 | Prague | Czech Republic | Congress Hall |
| 27 July 2013 | Prague | Czech Republic | Congress Hall |

== Charts and certifications ==
=== Weekly charts ===
| Chart (2013) | Peak position |
|---|---|
| Australian Albums (ARIA) | 31 |
| Austrian Albums (Ö3 Austria) | 10 |
| Belgian Albums (Ultratop Flanders) | 5 |
| Belgian Albums (Ultratop Wallonia) | 4 |
| Canadian Albums (Billboard) | 9 |
| Dutch Albums (Album Top 100) | 32 |
| Finnish Albums (Suomen virallinen lista) | 26 |
| French Albums (SNEP) | 3 |
| German Albums (Offizielle Top 100) | 41 |
| Hungarian Albums (MAHASZ) | 35 |
| Irish Albums (IRMA) | 21 |
| New Zealand Albums (RMNZ) | 22 |
| Norwegian Albums (VG-lista) | 23 |
| Scottish Albums (Official Charts) | 4 |
| Spanish Albums (Promusicae) | 71 |
| Swedish Albums (Sverigetopplistan) | 44 |
| Swiss Albums (Schweizer Hitparade) | 3 |
| UK Albums (Official Charts) | 3 |
| UK Jazz & Blues Albums (Official Charts) | 2 |
| US Billboard 200 | 21 |
| US Top Blues Albums (Billboard) | 1 |

=== Year-end charts ===
| Chart (2013) | Position |
|---|---|
| Belgian Albums (Ultratop Flanders) | 103 |
| Belgian Albums (Ultratop Wallonia) | 45 |
| French Albums (SNEP) | 114 |
| UK Albums (OCC) | 141 |
| US Top Blues Albums (Billboard) | 6 |

=== Certifications ===
| Region | Certification | Certified units/sales |
|---|---|---|
| France (SNEP) | Gold | 50,000^{*} |
^{*} Sales figures based on certification alone.
