= The Gun Seller =

Debut novel by Hugh Laurie

- 1st edition cover (Heinemann)
- Author: Hugh Laurie
- Publisher: Heinemann
- Publication date: 1996
- Pages: 339
- ISBN: 1569470871
- OCLC: 243695128
- Dewey Decimal: 823/.914
- LC Class: PR6062.A8139 G8 1996b

The Gun Seller (1996) is the first novel by English actor, musician, comedian, and writer Hugh Laurie. It concerns former Scots Guards officer Thomas Lang and his reluctant involvement in a conspiracy involving international arms dealers, terrorists, the CIA, the MoD, beautiful women and fast motorcycles.

Wary of becoming another "celebrity author", Laurie initially submitted his manuscript under a pseudonym, only revealing his identity after it had been accepted for publication and having been persuaded by his publicist to use his real name for the sake of publicity.

== Plot summary ==
The Gun Seller tells the story of retired Army officer Thomas Lang, who lives a somewhat hand-to-mouth existence in London, his attention focused mainly on drinking whisky and riding his motorcycle. His income stems from a variety of bodyguard, strong-arm and mercenary jobs he undertakes, utilizing the skills he learned and contacts he made during his time in the Army.

After being approached in Amsterdam by a man asking him to assassinate American businessman Alexander Woolf, Lang attempts to warn the intended victim at his Belgravia flat, finding Woolf gone and instead clashing with (and incapacitating) a mercenary, then encountering Woolf's daughter Sarah. Afterward Lang finds himself under intense scrutiny from both the Ministry of Defence and the Central Intelligence Agency, who claim Woolf is an international drug smuggler currently under investigation. Intrigued by the sudden interest of two government agencies, Lang attempts to track down the man who approached him in Amsterdam, unexpectedly finding him in London, and even more unexpectedly discovering that the man is Alexander Woolf himself.

Eventually Woolf and his daughter agree to meet Lang at dinner and answer his questions. The elder Woolf explains that he tried to hire Lang as a hitman to see if he was a "good man", and admits he is under investigation, but not for selling drugs. Rather, Woolf is of interest because of what he knows about a next-generation light attack helicopter. More disturbingly, Woolf and Sarah claim that a conspiracy is under way to stage a terrorist attack and subsequently promote the light helicopter by sending one in to eliminate the terrorists. Lang is skeptical, but begins to believe the story after he is kidnapped and interrogated about Woolf. He frees himself, finding a heavily tortured Alexander Woolf in a nearby room. Mister Woolf is killed shortly thereafter as Lang makes his escape, killing his captors in the process.

With Sarah missing and now certain the conspiracy is real, Lang attempts to determine the main conspirators, aided by a friend of Sarah's named Ronnie. After some investigating he centers on a CIA Deputy Director named Barnes, who (forcibly) takes him to meet the head conspirator: billionaire Naimh Murdah. Murdah, owner of the company that manufactures the helicopter, openly admits to the plot and plainly states that Lang will be helping to carry out the terrorist attack, backing up his declaration with an open and explicit threat on Sarah's life. To illustrate his point, Murdah casually kills a CIA agent who accompanied Lang and Barnes to his home.

Lang is placed within a small terrorist group called the Sword of Justice as a Minnesotan named Ricky, officially to gather intelligence and minimize casualties. A Dutch politician is seemingly shot dead by Lang in Switzerland as a warm up activity by the Sword of Justice, although it was a set-up and the politician was briefed and was wearing body armour. During a brief return to London Lang encounters Sarah and confronts her regarding pictures, provided to him by his friend and handler Solomon, showing Sarah and Barnes together. Sarah admits to being a part of the conspiracy, but swears her father's death was never part of the arrangement.

Lang and Sword of Justice arrive in Casablanca and successfully take control of the American embassy there, holding a number of hostages. Barnes, Murdah, Sarah, and a number of other conspirators arrive in Casablanca to direct Lang and ensure the success of the plot. Lang covertly leaves the Embassy as directed, but as Murdah is talking to him Lang pulls a gun, slipped to him by Sarah as part of a plan they made in London. Lang forces Murdah into the Embassy at gunpoint and handcuffs him to a fire escape on the roof, then orders him to call off the helicopter attack. Murdah refuses, certain the attack will not come since he is in the line of fire, but Lang contends the greed of the remaining conspirators will ensure the attack goes as planned. Just as Lang predicted, the helicopter attacks, killing one of the terrorists, but before it can make another pass Lang shoots it down with a Javelin missile he smuggled into the embassy earlier.

Footage of the helicopter's attack and destruction is shown worldwide via news networks covering the siege, ruining any chance of any military investing in the helicopter. Lang releases a statement (via the terrorists) to CNN outlining the conspiracy, ensuring that the plot is thwarted. The Ministry of Defence flies a tired Lang and Solomon back to England. After landing Lang is greeted by Ronnie, who managed to force the Ministry to allow her to ride with him from the airport, and makes it quite clear she is happy to see him.

An epilogue notes that following its use to shoot down the helicopter, sales of the Javelin rose significantly, ironically meaning that in foiling the plot to promote the helicopter, Lang promoted the Javelin instead.

== Film, TV, audiobook, or theatrical adaptations ==
In an interview found in the back of some Washington Square Press editions of the book, Laurie states that (at the time of the interview) he recently finished writing a screenplay adaptation of The Gun Seller for United Artists. An audiobook edition published by Highbridge Audio is available as of 16 October 2012, narrated by Audie Award-winner Simon Prebble, produced by Greg Lawrence at on Purpose Productions.

== Possible sequel ==
Laurie is rumoured to have written a second book, The Paper Soldier. Amazon.com announced that this novel would be published in mid-September 2007. However, as the date came and passed, Laurie's agent announced that this was a mistake on Amazon's part and that Laurie had not even written the novel yet. Amazon then stated that Paper Soldier would be published in September 2009; it wasn't. The book is listed on Amazon but remains unpublished.

== Reception ==
In January 2009, thirteen years after the original English publication, a French translation of the novel entitled Tout est sous contrôle ("Everything's Under Control") was published by Sonatine, and later topped book charts in March 2009 in France. Croatian translation by Ivana Ameri entitled Vrlo komplicirana trgovina ("A Very Complicated Trade") was published by the Profil publisher in 2015.
