= List of awards and nominations received by Hugh Laurie =

List of Hugh Laurie's awards
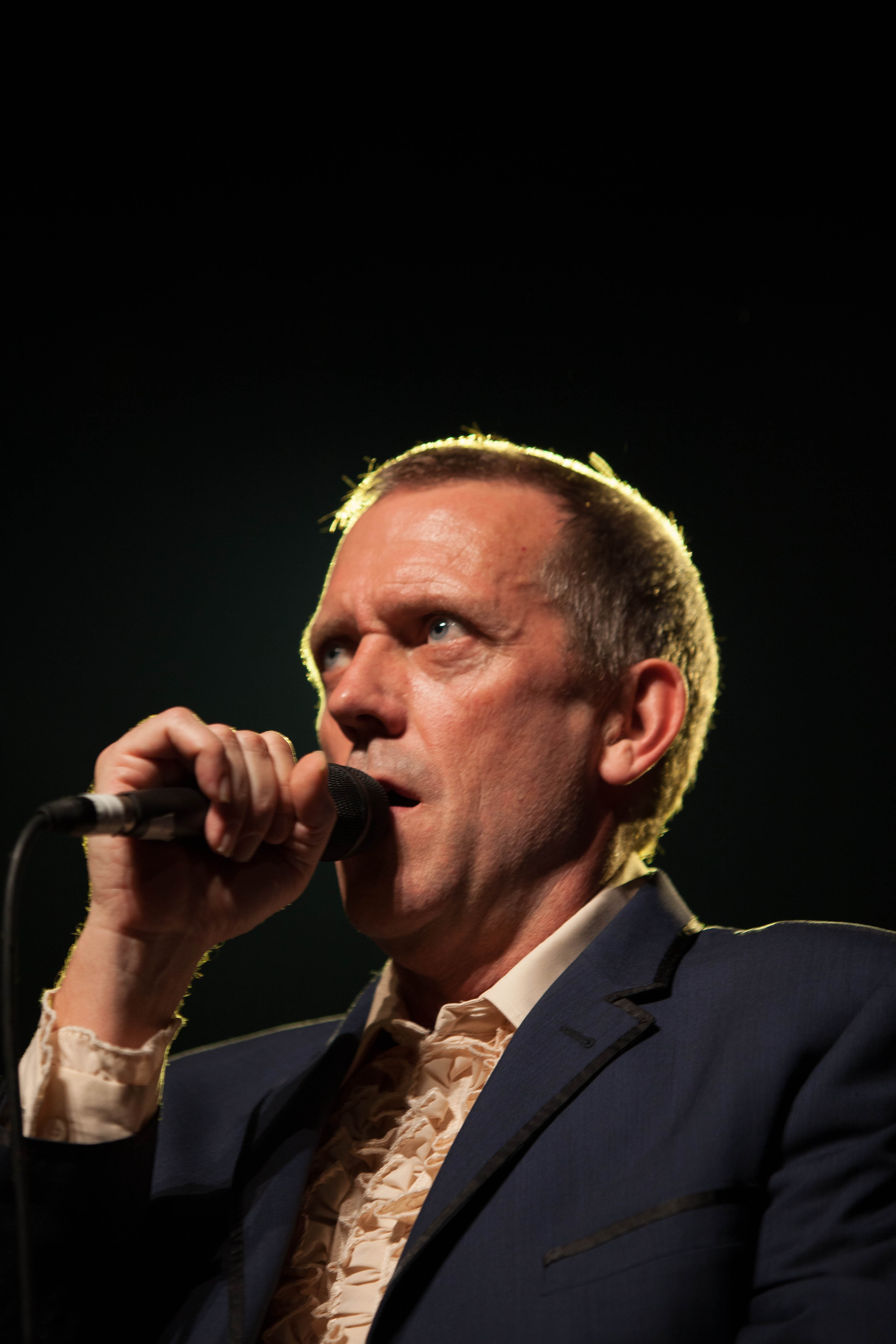
- Laurie in 2012
Award	Wins	Nominations
Primetime Emmy Awards	0	10
Golden Globe Awards	3	7
Screen Actors Guild Awards	2	9

The following is a list of awards and nominations received by Hugh Laurie.

Laurie is an English actor, comedian, singer, and producer. Throughout his career, he has received ten Primetime Emmy Award nominations for his performances in the medical drama House (2005–2011), the limited series The Night Manager (2016), and Veep (2017). He also received seven Golden Globe Award nominations winning three times, twice for Best Actor in a Television Drama Series for House and for Best Supporting Actor – Series, Miniseries or Television Film for The Night Manager. He also received nine Screen Actors Guild Award nominations winning twice for Outstanding Performance by a Male Actor in a Drama Series for his leading performance in House.

== Major associations ==
=== Primetime Emmy Awards ===
Year	Category	Nominated work	Result	Ref.
2005	Outstanding Lead Actor in a Drama Series	House	Nominated	
2007	Outstanding Lead Actor in a Drama Series	House	Nominated	
2008	Outstanding Lead Actor in a Drama Series	House	Nominated	
2009	Outstanding Lead Actor in a Drama Series	House	Nominated	
2009	Outstanding Drama Series	House	Nominated	
2010	Outstanding Lead Actor in a Drama Series	House	Nominated	
2011	Outstanding Lead Actor in a Drama Series	House	Nominated	
2016	Outstanding Supporting Actor in a Limited Series or Movie	The Night Manager	Nominated	
2016	Outstanding Limited Series	The Night Manager	Nominated	
2017	Outstanding Guest Actor in a Comedy Series	Veep	Nominated	

=== Golden Globe Awards ===
Year	Category	Nominated work	Result	Ref.
2006	Best Actor – Television Series Drama	House	Won	
2007	Best Actor – Television Series Drama	House	Won	
2008	Best Actor – Television Series Drama	House	Nominated	
2009	Best Actor – Television Series Drama	House	Nominated	
2010	Best Actor – Television Series Drama	House	Nominated	
2011	Best Actor – Television Series Drama	House	Nominated	
2017	Best Supporting Actor – Television	The Night Manager	Won	

=== Screen Actors Guild awards ===
Year	Category	Nominated work	Result	Ref.
2006	Outstanding Actor in a Drama Series	House	Nominated	
2007	Outstanding Actor in a Drama Series	House	Won	
2008	Outstanding Actor in a Drama Series	House	Nominated	
2009	Outstanding Ensemble in a Drama Series	House	Nominated	
2009	Outstanding Actor in a Drama Series	House	Won	
2010	Outstanding Actor in a Drama Series	House	Nominated	
2011	Outstanding Actor in a Drama Series	House	Nominated	
2016	Outstanding Ensemble in a Comedy Series	Veep	Nominated	
2017	Outstanding Ensemble in a Comedy Series	Veep	Nominated	

=== Television Critics Association awards ===
Year	Category	Nominated work	Result	Ref.
2005	Individual Achievement in Drama	House	Won	
2006	Individual Achievement in Drama	House	Won	
2007	Individual Achievement in Drama	House	Nominated	
2009	Individual Achievement in Drama	House	Nominated	
2016	Outstanding Achievement in Movies, Miniseries and Specials	The Night Manager	Nominated	

== Other awards ==
=== Annie Awards ===
Year	Category	Nominated work	Result	Ref.
2010	Outstanding Voice Acting in a Feature Production	Monsters vs. Aliens	Nominated	

=== British Independent Film Awards ===
Year	Category	Nominated work	Result	Ref.
2019	Best Supporting Actor	The Personal History of David Copperfield	Won	

=== People's Choice Awards ===
Year	Category	Nominated work	Result	Ref.
2009	Favorite Male TV Star	House	Won	
2010	Favorite Male TV Star	House	Won	
2011	Favorite TV Doctor	House	Won	
2011	Favorite TV Drama Actor	House	Won	
2012	Favorite TV Drama Actor	House	Nominated	

=== Satellite Awards ===
Year	Category	Nominated work	Result	Ref.
2005	Best Actor – Television Series Drama	House	Won	
2006	Best Actor – Television Series Drama	House	Won	
2007	Best Actor – Television Series Drama	House	Nominated	
2016	Best Actor in a Supporting Role – Television	The Night Manager	Nominated	

=== Teen Choice Awards ===
Year	Category	Nominated work	Result	Ref.
2007	TV Actor: Drama	House	Won	
2011	TV Actor: Drama	House	Nominated	
