= Let Them Talk (Hugh Laurie album) =

2011 debut studio album by Hugh Laurie

Studio album by Hugh Laurie
- Released: 18 April 2011
- Recorded: 26–27 July, 1 September, 4–8 & 21 October 2010
- Genre: Blues
- Length: 57:56
- Label: Warner Bros.
- Producer: Joe Henry

Hugh Laurie chronology
Let Them Talk (2011)	Didn't It Rain (2013)

Singles from Let Them Talk
- 1. "You Don't Know My Mind" Released: Early 2011; 2. "Winin' Boy Blues" Released: 2 October 2011

Let Them Talk is the debut studio album by English actor and musician Hugh Laurie.

The album, which consists of classic blues songs, was released on 9 May 2011. Some of the songs are collaborations with well-known artists such as Tom Jones, Irma Thomas and Dr. John. Laurie plays piano and guitar on the album in addition to providing lead vocals. Kevin Breit plays guitar and Vincent Henry plays saxophones. The album was produced by Joe Henry and features horn arrangements by Allen Toussaint.

Laurie premiered some of the songs in a small New Orleans club in March 2011, and started officially touring with these materials in April 2011 with two consecutive live concerts in Germany. In the UK, he performed at the Union Chapel in London, at the Cheltenham Jazz Festival, Warwick Arts Centre in Coventry, and at Manchester's Royal Northern College of Music. Laurie also made several television appearances, including BBC2 programmes The Graham Norton Show and Later... with Jools Holland, and was interviewed on BBC Radio 2's Chris Evans Breakfast Show.

On 15 May 2011, Laurie appeared in the UK ITV series Perspectives, explaining his love for the music of New Orleans and playing music from the album, at studios and live venues in the city of New Orleans itself.

A special edition of the album, containing three more songs, was released on 15 May 2011. A second blues album, named Didn't It Rain, was released on 6 May 2013.

Professional ratings
Aggregate scores
Source	Rating
Metacritic	61/100
Review scores
Source	Rating
AllMusic	3.5/5 stars
Mojo	3/5 stars
musicOMH	4/5 stars

== Critical reception ==
The album received favourable reviews, and holds a Metacritic score of 61 out of 100, based on 9 reviews, indicating "generally favorable" reviews. It also received a positive review in The Independent.

== Chart performance ==
Let Them Talk was the biggest-selling blues album of 2011 in the UK, with sales of 192,000 copies.

== Track listing ==
No.	Title	Length
1.	"St. James Infirmary"	6:25
2.	"You Don't Know My Mind"	3:39
3.	"Six Cold Feet"	4:55
4.	"Buddy Bolden's Blues"	3:12
5.	"Battle of Jericho"	3:47
6.	"After You've Gone" (featuring Dr. John)	4:09
7.	"Swanee River"	2:43
8.	"The Whale Has Swallowed Me"	3:37
9.	"John Henry" (featuring Irma Thomas)	3:34
10.	"Police Dog Blues"	3:33
11.	"Tipitina"	5:06
12.	"Winin' Boy Blues"	2:59
13.	"They're Red Hot"	1:11
14.	"Baby, Please Make a Change" (featuring Sir Tom Jones & Irma Thomas)	4:57
15.	"Let Them Talk"	4:10

Deluxe edition bonus tracks
No.	Title	Length
16.	"Guess I'm a Fool"	3:09
17.	"It Ain't Necessarily So"	3:46
18.	"Lowdown, Worried and Blue"	4:14

Special edition bonus tracks
No.	Title	Length
16.	"Hallelujah I Love Her So"	3:09
17.	"Crazy Arms"	3:11
18.	"Waiting for a Train"	3:34
19.	"You Don't Know My Mind" (live in Paris)	4:42

== Charts and certifications ==
=== Weekly charts ===
Weekly chart performance for Let Them Talk
Chart (2011)	Peak position
Australian Albums (ARIA)	37
Austrian Albums (Ö3 Austria)	1
Belgian Albums (Ultratop Flanders)	22
Belgian Albums (Ultratop Wallonia)	4
Canadian Albums (Billboard)	18
Czech Albums (IPFI	7
Dutch Albums (Album Top 100)	25
Finnish Albums (Suomen virallinen lista)	30
French Albums (SNEP)	2
German Albums (Offizielle Top 100)	8
Hungarian Albums (MAHASZ)	35
Irish Albums (IRMA)	14
Italian Albums (FIMI)	55
Norwegian Albums (VG-lista)	40
New Zealand Albums (RMNZ)	26
Polish Albums (OLiS)	22
Scottish Albums (OCC)	2
Spanish Albums (PROMUSICAE)	40
Swedish Albums (Sverigetopplistan)	54
Swiss Albums (Schweizer Hitparade)	4
UK Albums (OCC)	2
US Billboard 200	16
US Top Blues Albums (Billboard)	1

=== Year-end charts ===
2011 year-end chart performance for Let Them Talk
Chart (2011)	Position
Austrian Albums (Ö3 Austria)	60
Belgian Albums (Ultratop Wallonia)	24
French Albums (SNEP)	28
Polish Albums (ZPAV)	59
Swiss Albums (Schweizer Hitparade)	60
UK Albums (OCC)	59
US Top Blues Albums (Billboard)	3

2012 year-end chart performance for Let Them Talk
Chart (2012)	Position
French Albums (SNEP)	130
US Top Blues Albums (Billboard)	3

=== Certifications ===
Certifications for Let Them Talk
Region	Certification	Certified units/sales
Argentina (CAPIF)	Platinum	40,000^{^}
France (SNEP)	2× Platinum	300,000
Poland (ZPAV)	2× Platinum	40,000^{*}
United Kingdom (BPI)	Gold	192,000
^{*} Sales figures based on certification alone.^{^} Shipments figures based on certification alone.

== Release history ==
Release history for Let Them Talk
Region	Date
France	18 April 2011
Germany	29 April 2011
United Kingdom	9 May 2011
United States	6 September 2011
