= A Bit of Fry & Laurie =

British sketch comedy television series

- Title screen from the first series of A Bit of Fry & Laurie
- Created by: Stephen Fry; Hugh Laurie
- Written by: Stephen Fry; Hugh Laurie
- Starring: Stephen Fry; Hugh Laurie
- Country of origin: United Kingdom
- Original language: English
- No. of series: 4
- No. of episodes: 26 (list of episodes)

Production
- Producers: Kevin Bishop; Roger Ordish; Nick Symons
- Running time: 30 minutes

Original release
- Network: BBC1 (pilot, series 4); BBC2 (series 1-3)
- Release: 26 December 1987 – 2 April 1995

A Bit of Fry & Laurie is a British sketch comedy television series written by and starring former Cambridge Footlights members Stephen Fry and Hugh Laurie, broadcast on both BBC1 and BBC2 between 13 January 1989 and 2 April 1995. It ran for four series with 26 episodes, including a 36-minute pilot episode on 26 December 1987.

As in The Two Ronnies, elaborate wordplay and innuendo were staples. It frequently broke the fourth wall; characters would revert to their real-life actors mid-sketch, or the camera would often pan off set into the studio. The show was punctuated with non sequitur vox pops in a style similar to those of Monty Python's Flying Circus, often making irrelevant statements and wordplay. Laurie was also seen playing piano and other instruments and singing comical numbers.

== Broadcast details ==
The 36-minute pilot was broadcast on BBC1 at 11:55 pm on Boxing Day 1987, although it was later edited to 29 minutes for repeat transmissions (including broadcasts on the Paramount Comedy Channel). The full version is intact on the Series 1 DVD. It was the first pilot Fry and Laurie had produced for the BBC since 1983; their previous attempt, The Crystal Cube, had not met with the BBC's approval.

The show began its full run at 9:00 pm on Friday 13 January 1989. The first three series were screened on BBC2, the traditional home for the BBC's sketch shows, while the fourth series switched to the mainstream BBC1. The last series was the least well-received. BBC1 was not considered the best place to showcase Fry and Laurie's arch humour; it featured celebrity guests in all but one episode, an addition which neither Fry nor Laurie approved; and it was shown not long after Fry's nervous breakdown in 1995, which cast a shadow over the series. One reviewer said that, perhaps owing to this, Fry got more of the laughs, while Laurie was increasingly relegated to the "straight man" role.

Guest performers frequently appeared during the first three series before they were made a permanent fixture in the fourth. These included Selina Cadell (Series 2, episode 4), Paul Eddington (Series 2, episode 5), Nigel Havers (Series 2, episode 6), Rowan Atkinson (Series 2, episode 6), Nicholas Parsons (Series 3, episode 1), Rebecca Saire (Series 3, episode 2 and 5), Gary Davies (Series 3, episode 6) and Colin Stinton (Series 3, episode 6).

In 2010, the duo reunited for a retrospective special, titled Fry and Laurie Reunited.

== Satire ==
A scene from one of the many sketches in the show, entitled The Privatisation of the Police Force

The show did not shy away from commenting on issues of the day. A sketch in the second series, in which a Conservative government minister is strangled while Stephen Fry screams at him "What are you doing to the television system? What are you doing to the country?", is an attack on the Broadcasting Act of 1990 and the perceived motivations of those who supported it. The pair would later attack what they saw as the Act's malign after effects in the sketch "It's a Soaraway Life", a parody of It's a Wonderful Life evoking a world in which Rupert Murdoch never existed.

The series made numerous jokes at the expense of the Tory prime ministers, Margaret Thatcher and John Major, and one sketch depicted a televised "Young Tory of the Year" competition in which a young Conservative (Laurie) recites a deliberately incoherent speech consisting only of nonsense political buzzwords, such as "family values" and "individual enterprise".

Noel Edmonds was also a frequent target. During a sketch where Fry had supposedly removed Laurie's brain, Laurie came out and said that he had just finished watching Noel Edmonds and that he is fantastic.

== Catchphrases ==
=== "Please, Mr Music, will you play?" ===
Each episode of Series 3 and 4 ends with Fry preparing a ridiculously named and even more ridiculously concocted cocktail. While he does this, Fry entreats Laurie to play the closing theme by saying, "Please, Mr Music, will you play?", a phrase Fry took from the Anglia TV children's TV show Romper Room. Fry then shakes the cocktail while dancing eccentrically and serves it to Laurie (in Series 3), or to both Laurie and the guest performers (in Series 4), while Laurie plays the piano and imitates the sound of a muted trumpet solo.

In series 3 and 4, Fry precedes the question with increasingly silly introductions:

- "I say, as I like to on these occasions, those six refreshing words that unlock the door to sophisticated evening happiness. I say:" (Series 4, episode 3)
- "And now into the cocktail shaker of my mouth I throw these six words: You Please Music Mr Will Play. I give a brief shake [he shakes his head and makes "brr" noises], and I pour out this golden phrase:" (Series 4, episode 4)
- "And as I prepare your Swinging Ballsacks, I ask this question, in accordance with known principles:" (Series 4, episode 5)
- "While I mix these, I turn to the debonair doyen of the dance and I ask as askingly as I might this ask:" (Series 4, episode 6)
- [Preparing a "Modern Britain"] "But perhaps, somewhere, you might be inspired to add one small, tender, caring cherry of hope. I wonder. While you decide, I will entreat for the very finalest of last, last times, this entreaty of m'colleague, Britain's very own melody man, as I say to him, please, please, oh:" (Series 4, episode 7)

=== "Soupy twist" ===
The catchphrase "soupy twist" is said by both Laurie and Fry at the end of each episode of series 3 and 4 (save the Series 3 closer), in a manner similar to 'cheers'. The guest performers say it as well in series 4.

=== "If you'll pardon the pun" ===
A running joke had one character adding "if you'll pardon the pun" mid-conversation, when there had, in fact, been no pun uttered. The second character, puzzled, would say, "What pun?" and the first character would say, "Oh, wasn't there one? I'm sorry", and resume the conversation.

=== "M'colleague" ===
"M'colleague" is a phrase that Fry and Laurie began using during the second series to refer to each other. Both have since used this phrase outside the series to refer to the other, for example on chat shows, the dedication in Fry's novel The Stars' Tennis Balls which reads "To m'colleague", as well as the one in his second autobiography, The Fry Chronicles, which reads "To m'coll".

== Recurring characters ==
Though the programme mostly consisted of one-time situations and sketches, a few characters appeared over several episodes and series.

=== Alan ===
Alan (Laurie) is hired as a secret agent by a mysterious organisation known only as 'The Department', before which he was a gun-runner, supply teacher, and Home Secretary. The character is a parody of several television shows of the 1970s, most prominently The Professionals.

=== The Bishop and the Warlord ===
The Bishop (Fry) and the Warlord (Laurie) first appear in series 1, episode 4. They are portrayed as the world's leading "light metal" band (as opposed to heavy metal). The Warlord (guitarist) is dressed as a typical rocker, whereas the Bishop (vocalist) is dressed in his normal vestments, and one black fingerless glove. He sings (or rather speaks) his songs from a pulpit.

=== Control and Tony ===
Control (Fry) and Tony Murchison (Laurie) are two excessively nice secret agents who first appear in series 1 of the show. Control is head of SIS, the British secret service. Tony Murchison is Subsection Chief of the East Germany and Related Satellites Desk, who brings Control his morning coffee. The characters discuss issues of national security with childish simplicity to parody the typically sparse details viewers were often afforded in British films of a similar genre. Much of the humour in these sketches arises from the stilted, amateurish, and inappropriate performance style. There were two written, but unaired, sketches featuring the pair, entitled "Spies Five" and "Spies/Twin"—the latter revealing that Control (whose real name was, in fact, Control) had a twin brother also named Control, who painted erotic murals in Earl's Court. The scripts for these sketches are available in the script-books.

=== Gelliant Gutfright ===
Gelliant (Fry) is the host of short horror programme The Seventh Dimension, who presents bizarre and nonsensical stories such as "Flowers for Wendy" and "The Red Hat of Patferrick". Seated in an improbably large gold-buttoned leather chair, he indulges in elaborate and often pointless wordplay: "It is called 'Flowers for Wendy', but might it not rather have been called 'You have been Warned'? [pause] No, it might not". The stories told were often in the style of The Twilight Zone.

=== Gordon and Stuart ===
Gordon (Fry) and Stuart (Laurie) are executives and old friends. Stuart is brash, arrogant and with a hugely inflated sense of his abilities. He often bullies and patronises the mild-mannered Gordon, who in fact displays far greater knowledge and better control of the situation. For instance, when the two lunch at a Greek restaurant, Gordon speaks fluent Greek to the waiter while Stuart, having boasted of his affinity with the Greek people and his appreciation for their cuisine, fails to recognise dolmades and retsina wine. Gordon does not seem to resent Stuart's obnoxious treatment of him or his behaviour in general and continues to cheerfully and skilfully deal with the situation, inadvertently showing Stuart to be hopelessly outclassed. This causes Stuart great consternation as he attempts to conceal his own inabilities and maintain his reputation as an intelligent and competent businessman.

=== Jack and Freddy/Neddy ===
Freddy (Laurie; character later renamed 'Neddy') is a meek, quiet man with a noticeable overbite (Laurie's performance is an homage to Peter Sellers' Lionel Mandrake in Dr. Strangelove). Jack (Fry) is an eyepatch-wearing, imposing man who belongs to an unnamed organisation. He recruits Freddy to participate in several of the organisation's efforts for the "cause", which he states to be freedom, although this may be hyperbolic. The characters stopped appearing after Neddy became prime minister. Neddy was being force-fed information from Jack when it became clear that Jack's organisation was a group of Nazis who were bent on ruling England through Neddy. Jack then stabbed Neddy in the back with his own Stanley knife.

=== John and Peter ===
John (Fry) and Peter (Laurie) are hard-driving, hard-drinking executives who are always partners, no matter what business they happen to be running; in most of their sketches they run a health club. Their antagonist in every business operation is the diabolical Marjorie (John's ex-wife). Eventually, Marjorie defeated the pair in the health club business off-screen, leading the two to run a public toilet and later the Diocese of Uttoxeter (John as Bishop, Peter as Executive Vice-Bishop). Although based in Uttoxeter throughout the series, John and Peter speak with American accents. The sketch is a parody of television drama of the period such as BBC TV's Howards' Way, which depicted relatively small-scale businessmen as larger-than-life, world-weary, passionate, and tormented. John and Peter are invariably exhorting one another to greater efforts on behalf of their relatively insignificant businesses, with their shouted catchphrases "Damn!" and "Dammit John!". They also drink heavily, often refilling their glasses and slopping their beverages (whisky, coffee, etc.) onto the floor or themselves. One written sketch entitled "Dammit 3" was unaired; those actually shown in the programme went straight from "Dammit 2" to "Dammit 4". The script for this sketch is available in the script books and online.

=== Mr Dalliard ===
Mr Dalliard is a non-appearing character in various sketches, all taking place in a shop. Though Dalliard never appears and is implied to be a creation of Fry's shopkeeper's imagination, he is referred and spoken to several times in every sketch, "He isn't my Mr Dalliard, he's everybody's Mr Dalliard".

=== Tony Inchpractice ===
Tony (Laurie) first appears in series 2. He is the host of several talk shows, each one devoted to an odd action performed by the host and the guest during the interview. The different shows are, Trying to Borrow a Fiver Off..., Introducing My Grandfather To..., Photocopying My Genitals With..., Realising I've Given the Wrong Directions To... and Flying a Light Aeroplane Without Having Had Any Formal Instruction With.... The character was originally modelled upon a similar figure named Peter Mostyn whom Laurie had earlier portrayed on Saturday Live. There was also a similar sketch called In the Bath With... on the radio series Saturday Night Fry.

=== Vox pops ===
Between sketches, both Laurie and Fry appear as people in the street, including a police officer, a drifting geek, a woman who suddenly remembers she has "left the iron on", a pensioner who says that he "wouldn't suck it", without specifying what 'it' is and then walking off laughing, an old conservative and others. Such insertions became less frequent in the last two series.

== Episodes ==
- Pilot: 26 December 1987 (36 minutes)
- Series One: 13 January 1989 – 17 February 1989 (six episodes)
- Series Two: 9 March 1990 – 13 April 1990 (six episodes)
- Series Three: 9 January 1992 – 13 February 1992 (six episodes)
- Series Four: 12 February 1995 – 2 April 1995 (seven episodes)

Two compilations were broadcast on BBC Radio 4 on 11 August 1994.

== DVD releases ==
After much fan-driven petition, the first series of A Bit of Fry and Laurie, plus the pilot, was released on DVD on 3 April 2006 in Region 2. Series two was released on 12 June, with a bonus feature, the 45-minute Cambridge Footlights Revue (1982) in which Fry and Laurie appear with Emma Thompson, Tony Slattery, Penny Dwyer and Paul Shearer.

The third series followed in October 2006. Amazon UK released a complete box set (all 4 series) on 30 October 2006, along with series 4 itself.

Series 1 was released on 6 July 2007 in Region 4. Region 1 versions of the first two series were released in the United States and Canada on 22 August 2006.

There is a copyright-related music edit on the series 1 DVD during the final sketch of episode 6 ("Tony of Plymouth (Sword Fight)"). In the broadcast version, the music was from the soundtrack of "The Sea Hawk" but instead a new piece of music has been used, drowning out most of the dialogue in the process. In series 2, Saint-Saëns is not credited for the end music ("Finale" from The Carnival of the Animals) until the second half of the series. On the series 3 DVD for Region 1, the sketch which features Laurie and Fry singing The Beatles' "Hey Jude" has been omitted.

In Australia, A Little Bit of Fry & Laurie: Series One Episodes 1–3 (Comedy Bites) was released on 4 March 2010.

All four series of A Bit of Fry & Laurie are available on Netflix and for digital download from several sources.

All four series, and the pilot, of A Bit of Fry & Laurie are available to stream on Amazon's Prime Video service.

=== DVD release dates ===
Series DVD	No. of Episodes	Year	Release Date		
Series DVD	No. of Episodes	Year	Region 1	Region 2	Region 4
Complete Series 1	6	1987 & 1989	22 August 2006	3 April 2006	6 July 2006
Complete Series 2	6	1990	22 August 2006	12 June 2006	15 March 2007
Complete Series 3	6	1992	24 July 2007	4 September 2006	4 July 2007
Complete Series 4	7	1995	24 July 2007	30 October 2006	5 March 2008
Complete Series 1–4	25	1987–1995	24 July 2007	30 October 2006	17 August 2006

== Music ==
Laurie's musical talents featured on the show in the form of plot points in a sketch and satirical songs. The first such song, "Mystery", parodies a mournful love song from a lounge singer (Laurie mimics the vocal mannerisims of Sammy Davis Jr.) and presents the obstacles to a relationship between the singer and the object of affection, which become more outlandish every verse: she lives in a different country, would probably have a problem with the singer's job ("with the Thames Water Authority"), has never actually met and may indeed "take a violent dislike" to the singer, and has been dead since 1973 ("fifteen years come next Jan-uary"). Laurie later played the song when appearing on an episode of Inside the Actors Studio in 2006. His songs include:

- "Little Girl": Wearing a false pencil moustache and overly oiled hair, Laurie, in the role of a child pornographer-celebrity photographer, tells in the style of Noël Coward of how he made an underaged girl famous by seducing and taking wildly erotic pictures of her. Pictures of Page Three girls appear in the background as he sings. As the paparazzo continues to photograph the girl throughout her lifetime, she becomes a singing sensation, marries and divorces a pop singer, and fades out of the public eye. The photographer ends his song by mourning that the "little girl" is no longer little or a girl, but on the bright side, she has a young daughter whom the photographer would very much like to meet.
- "America": Laurie dresses in what was, at the time, the standard American rock star "uniform"—flannel, white T-shirt, jeans, sneakers, and a bandana headband in the style of Bruce Springsteen and Jimi Hendrix. Laurie dramatically sings the song, the lyrics of which consist of "...America, America, America..." and "...the States, the States, the States...", until Fry comes on stage, quite annoyed, and punches him.
- "The Sophisticated Song": Laurie, in a white and black suit, plays guitar, accompanied by a back-up band, singing about how normally he is very cool until he needs to talk to his true love, at which point he becomes so speechless, he begins to drool.
- "The Polite Rap": Prancing around in neon gangsta clothing, Laurie parodies the hip hop culture with this rap telling people to be nice, rather than bad, and that he's a "good-ass motherliker", rather than "bad-ass motherfucker".
- "Where is the Lid?": Laurie announces that he has written a "savage, angry" song about "jars that become separated from their lids". Playing the piano, he sings "Where is the lid?" mournfully and repetitively. In the background, Fry finds a stray lid, and tries it on an open jar sitting on the piano; it fits, and he pleads with Laurie to stop singing as the lid has been found and restored to its jar. Laurie ignores Fry and continues to play until Fry punches him. (This is immediately followed by a mini-feature about Laurie's "death".) This song is thematically and musically very similar to "America".
- "There Ain't But One Way": Laurie and Fry, dressed as two rednecks, introduce the song. A jibe at American Southern patriotism, Laurie sings about how the only way to solve the world's problems, from the hole in the ozone layer to poverty, is to "kick some ass", while Fry, playing his mentally challenged brother ("the victim of an unfortunate musical accident"), shouts out "yee-hah!" and repeats "kickin' AY-ass!" when sung by Laurie and stomps around, eventually falling offstage.
- "I'm in Love with Steffi Graf": Laurie once again has a back-up band while he plays the acoustic guitar, and makes a play at the depressing grunge music of the 1990s. He overdramatically flips the hair out of his eyes in the style of Robert Smith of The Cure and, affecting an effeminate lisp, proclaims his love for tennis player Steffi Graf. He goes so far as to proclaim that he stalked her during her tournaments and finally reveals himself as the man who stabbed Monica Seles as revenge for her defeat of Graf, a big news story in 1993. While the tune is performed, a slideshow of Steffi Graf playing tennis is shown on a projector screen.
- "Too Long Johnny": Laurie appears dressed in a black suit and wearing a red fedora. He plays slide guitar on a resonator guitar and, affecting a bluesman accent, he sings, "Too long, Johnny, too long, it's way too long", then proceeds to sing/explain about how he wants to cut "it" down to a perfect length. Though Johnny does get "it" down to the perfect length, he claims he made "its" width much too narrow, and must now start all over again.
- "Hey Jude": Laurie plays his grand piano and sings "Hey Jude" by The Beatles, in a voice reminiscent of Pinky and Perky. Fry eventually joins him on stage and begins to sing along in an impossibly deep voice. Fry then holds up cue cards so the audience may sing along with the "na na na na" of the refrain. Hugh Laurie played the piano one octave lower than usual while singing normally, this was then transposed one octave up to give a normal sounding piano with a high-pitched voice.
- "Love Me Tender": Laurie once again covers a famous musician, this time Elvis Presley. He even adopts a Presley-esque voice for the song. However, Laurie's attempt at seriousness becomes decidedly skewed after the camera pans out, revealing that he is singing to Nicholas Parsons sitting on a stool. Laurie finishes up the song then tenderly kisses the shoulder of Parsons's suit.
- "What I Mind": Laurie on piano and accompanied by a backup band sings a country song about hard times with his "girl", who will not stop referring to him as an inanimate object, such as a hoover, a key, and a garage.
- "The Protest Song": Laurie again provides himself with a backup band and plays acoustic guitar as well as harmonica. He spoofs American college activist rock, singing about how everyone can make the world a better place. Much like his cover of "Love Me Tender", this song appears to be Laurie's attempt at seriousness, at least until he reaches the part when he must actually sing what everyone is supposed to do to build a better society. Every time he reaches this part, as if unable to think of an actual course of action to save the world, he mumbles incoherently in to the microphone. When he reaches the end of the song, he repeats the line "All we gotta do is..." several times, and then resumes playing the harmonica. He also performed this song on BBC's Comic Relief telethon in 1993, and in 2006 alongside his hosting duties on an edition of Saturday Night Live.

== Publications ==
Four collections of A Bit of Fry and Laurie scripts have been published.

- A Bit of Fry & Laurie. Mandarin Publishing. 1990. ISBN 0-7493-0705-6.
- A Bit More Fry & Laurie. Mandarin Publishing. 1991. ISBN 0-7493-1076-6.
- 3 Bits of Fry & Laurie. Mandarin Publishing. 1992. ISBN 0-7493-1701-9.
- Fry & Laurie Bit No. 4. Mandarin Publishing. 1995. ISBN 0-7493-1967-4.

The official authorised Fry & Laurie story, Soupy Twists by Jem Roberts, was published by Unbound in 2018.
