= Siobhan Redmond =

Scottish actress (born 1959)

Siobhan Redmond MBE
- Born: 27 July 1959 (age 67); Glasgow, Scotland
- Education: University of St Andrews (MA)
- Occupation: Actress
- Years active: 1982–present

Siobhan Redmond (/ʃɪˈvɔːn/ shiv-AWN; born 27 July 1959) is a Scottish actress, a member of the Royal Shakespeare Company, and known for various stage, audio, film, and television roles such as Anne Marie in Two Doors Down.

== Early life ==
Redmond was born in the Tollcross area of Glasgow, the second-eldest of three children to Charlotte Redmond, a drama teacher, and John Redmond, a university lecturer. She attended the Sunshine School of Dance and Park School for Girls in Glasgow's West End.

Redmond studied at the University of St Andrews, where she earned a Master of Arts degree in English. At university, she has said to have been "discovered" by playwright Liz Lochhead while performing in a student Mermaids society production written by Marcella Evaristi. Redmond also completed a course in massage and undertook a postgraduate year at the Bristol Old Vic.

== Career ==
She began appearing on television in the early 1980s, firstly in the sketch show There's Nothing to Worry About! in 1982. She featured in two series of Alfresco in 1983 and 1984, but her first major television success was as George Bulman's assistant Lucy McGinty in Bulman (1985–1987). She played, among other roles, Maureen Connell in Between the Lines (1992–1994); Shona Spurtle in The High Life (1994–1995); Madame Sin in In the Red BBC TV adaptation of the novel (1998); Janice Taylor in Holby City (2000–2002), Sharon in The Smoking Room (2004–2005); Maeve Brown in EastEnders; clinical psychiatrist Pru Plunkett in Midsomer Murders; and Ailsa in Shoebox Zoo. She also appeared on radio including in the 2002 BBC Radio 4 series The Further Adventures of Sherlock Holmes, and as Jean Brash in BBC Radio 4's McLevy series.

Redmond is also a stage actress. In 2003, she starred in The Prime of Miss Jean Brodie, and is a member of the Royal Shakespeare Company, with whom she appeared as Maria in Twelfth Night in 2007. She played Titania/Hippolyta for Shakespeare's Globe in A Midsummer Night's Dream, in its summer 2008 season.

In 2004, Redmond starred in the BBC TV series Sea of Souls as twin sisters Carol and Helen. Redmond appeared in the "Gingers for Justice" sketch on The Catherine Tate Show in 2005, and then again in 2006. In 2007, she joined The Bill as Crime Scene Examiner Lorna Hart, and in 2010, played one of the leads in David Greig's play Dunsinane, reprising her role for the BBC Radio 3 adaptation on 30 January 2011.

On 26 June 2014, it was announced that Redmond would play a new incarnation of the Rani, a villainous character in the long-running series Doctor Who, originally portrayed on television by Kate O'Mara, who had died earlier that year. Redmond's version of the Rani is featured in BBC-licensed audio dramas by Big Finish Productions including The Rani Elite (2014) and Planet of the Rani (2015).

In November 2014, Redmond joined Alun Armstrong and William Gaunt in a production of Eugène Ionesco's Exit the King at the Ustinov Studio in Bath.

In 2018, Redmond appeared in three episodes in Series 3 of Unforgotten as Derran Finch, and in 2019, she appeared in the Acorn TV series Queens of Mystery as Jane Stone.

In January 2020, Redmond played the role of the Principal of Newnham College, Cambridge in the ITV series Grantchester.

In 2021, Redmond starred in the BBC Scotland comedy pilot Beep alongside Lois Chimimba and Paul Higgins. She played Liz, a woman visiting her comatose husband on their anniversary, the programme exploring their dysfunctional family's dynamics.

In November 2022, Redmond joined the cast of Two Doors Down as Colin's new partner Anne Marie.

She appeared as Grey in the 2023 BBC comedy Rain Dogs.

== Filmography ==
=== Film ===
Year	Title	Role	Notes
1986	Half Moon Street	Institute Secretary	
1986	Duet for One	Totter's wife	
1994	Captives	Sue	
1994	Mary Shelley's Frankenstein	Midwife	
1995	Latin for a Dark Room	Maria McKillop	Short film
1997	Karmic Mothers – Fact or Fiction?	Jeanie	Short film
1999	Beautiful People	Kate Higgins	
2013	Mission	Carolyn Black	Short film
2016	Alice Through the Looking Glass	Bumalig Hightopp	
2018	The Party's Just Beginning	Liusaidh's Mum	
2018	2:Hrs	Lena Eidelhorn	
2019	Dark Sense	Amelia Watkins	
2020	Ghost Light	Woman in the Wings	Short film
2020	Fare Well	(voice)	Short film
2021	Creation Stories	Barbara McGee	
2025	One Night in the Bath	Kim	Post-production
TBA	Hogmany	Heather	Short film. Post-production

=== Television ===
Year	Title	Role	Notes
1982	There's Nothing to Worry About!	Various characters	Episodes 1–3
1983–1984	Alfresco	Various characters	Series 1 & 2; 13 episodes
1984	End of the Line	Gail	Episode 4: "Sweet Nothings"
1985–1987	Bulman	Lucy McGinty	Series 1 & 2; 20 episodes
1986	Taggart	Judy Morris	Series 2; episodes 1 & 2: "Knife Edge: Parts One & Two"
1988	Turn on to T-Bag	Scoop Shuttleworth	Episode 5: "Pyramids"
1988	The Play on One	Clare Lafferty	Series 1; episode 4: "The Dunroamin' Rising"
1988	Casting Off	Gillian	Comedy series
1989	Hard Cases	Liz Norton	Series 2; episode 1
1989	Look Back in Anger	Helena Charles	Television film
1990	The Gravy Train	British Wife	Mini-series; episode 1
1991	4 Play	Janet Cording	Series 2; episode 5: "Ball on the Slates"
1991	Casualty	Betty Jones	Series 6; episode 12: "Pressure! What Pressure?"
1992	The Bill	Sylvia Hannah	Series 8; episode 34: "Trial and Error"
1992	The Advocates	Janie Naismith	Series 2; episodes 1–3
1992–1994	Between the Lines	DS Maureen Connell	Series 1–3; 35 episodes
1994	Rab C. Nesbitt	Presenter	Series 4; episode 5: "Eorpa"
1994, 1995	The High Life	Shona Spurtle	Pilot (1994), and episodes 1–6 (1995)
1995	Sorry About Last Night	Julie Cordova	Television film
1995	Screen Two	Joyce	Series 12; episode 4: "Nervous Energy"
1996	A Relative Stranger	Alison Fraiman	Television film
1997	Throwaways	Mother	Mini-series
1997	Wokenwell	Cheryl Cappler	Episode 1
1997	Screen One	Jean Brodie	Special episode 6: "Deacon Brodie"
1998	In the Red	Ms. Sin	Mini-series; episodes 1–3
1999	Every Woman Knows a Secret	Jess	Episodes 1–3
2000–2002	Holby City	Janice Taylor	Series 3 & 4; 49 episodes
2002	Ed Stone Is Dead	Angela	Episode 10: "City of Angels"
2004	Sea of Souls	Carol Fleming / Helen Reid	Series 1; episodes 1 & 2: "Seeing Double: Parts 1 & 2"
2004	Shoebox Zoo	Alisa the Adder (voice)	Series 1; episodes 1–13
2004–2005	The Smoking Room	Sharon	Series 1 & 2; 13 episodes
2005	The Afternoon Play	Donna Cline	Series 3; episode 2: "The Trouble with George"
2005	The Catherine Tate Show	Ginger Refuge Lady	Series 2; episode 1: "Ginger Bigotry"
2006	Midsomer Murders	Pru Plunkett	Series 9; episode 8: "Last Year's Model"
2006	New Tricks	Christine Gascoine	Series 3; episode 1: "Lady's Pleasure"
2006	EastEnders	Maeve Brown	3 episodes
2007	The Lift	Christabel	Television film
2007	The Bill	CSE Lorna Hart	Series 23; 13 episodes
2007–2015	Nina and the Neurons	Ollie the Smell Neuron (voice)	Series 1, 3 & 7–11; 55 episodes
2009	Boy Meets Girl	Psychiatrist	Mini-series; episode 3
2009	Theatre Live!	Mary	Episode 1: "Mind Away"
2010	Taggart	Chief Supt. Karen Campbell	Series 27; episodes 1–4 & 6
2012	Benidorm	Hazel	Series 5; episode 5
2012	The Town	Kate Nicholas	Mini-series; episode 1
2013	Bob Servant Independent	Dr. Walker	Mini-series; episode 5: "The Debate"
2013	Doctors	Carrie Garland	Series 14; episode 219: "Tea for Three"
2013	Case Histories	Mary Mackie	Series 2; episode 2: "Nobody's Darling"
2015	Code of a Killer	Joy Blakefield	Mini-series; episode 2
2017	The Replacement	Beth	Mini-series; episodes 1–3
2017	Clique	University Dean	Series 1; episode 6
2018	Lovesick	Janie Witter	Series 3; episode 5: "Martha"
2018	Unforgotten	Derran Finch	Series 3; episodes 4–6
2019–2021	Queens of Mystery	Jane Stone	Series 1 & 2; 12 episodes
2020	Grantchester	Andrea Shaw	Series 5; episode 1
2020	The Nest	Sheriff	Mini-series; episode 5
2021	Beep	Liz	Television film
2021	Midsomer Murders	Ronnie Everett	Series 22; episode 1: "The Wolf Hunter of Little Worthy"
2022	Inside No. 9	Matilda	Series 7; episode 3: "Nine Lives Kat"
2022	The Scotts	Cynthia	Series 2; episode 4
2022	Two Doors Down	Anne-Marie	Series 6; 4 episodes
2023	Rain Dogs	Grey	Episodes 7 & 8: "You Just Haven't Earned It Yet, Baby" and "This Is Not an Exit"
2023	Sister Boniface Mysteries	Miss Fitz D'Arcy	Series 3; episode 1: "The Star of the Orient"
2025	Death in Paradise	Francesca Bower	Series 14; episode 4
2025	Casualty	Sandra Evans	Series 40; episode 3

== Theatre ==
Year	Title	Role	Company	Director	Notes
1982	Tickly Mince	Various	Merryhell at the Tron Theatre, Glasgow		review by Alasdair Gray, Liz Lochhead and Tom Leonard
1983	The Pie of Damocles	Various	Merryhell at the Tron Theatre, Glasgow		review by Alasdair Gray, Liz Lochhead, Tom Leonard and James Kelman
1990	A Midsummer Night's Dream	Titania	Renaissance Theatre Company	Kenneth Brannagh	play by William Shakespeare
1990	King Lear	Goneril	Renaissance Theatre Company	Kenneth Brannagh	play by William Shakespeare
1998	Perfect Days	Barbs	Traverse Theatre, Edinburgh	John Tiffany	play by Liz Lochhead
2003	The Prime of Miss Jean Brodie	Jean Brodie	Lyceum Theatre, Edinburgh	Muriel Romanes	Jay Presson Allen's dramatisation of the novel by Muriel Spark
2006	Mary Stuart	Elizabeth	Citizen's Theatre, Glasgow	Vicky Featherstone	David Harrower's adaptation of Friedrich Schiller's tragedy
2011	Dunsinane	Gruach	National Theatre of Scotland / Royal Shakespeare Company	Roxana Silbert	play by David Greig
2014	Exit the King	Marguerite	Ustinov Studio, Bath	Laurence Boswell	play by Eugène Ionesco
2016	Thon Man Molière	Madeleine Béjart	Lyceum Theatre, Edinburgh	Tony Cownie	play by Liz Lochhead
2026	The High Life: The Musical	Shona Spurtle	National Theatre of Scotland / Dundee Rep	Andrew Panton	musical by Johnny McKnight
2026	Happy Days	Winnie	Pitlochry Festival Theatre	Roxana Silbert	play by Samuel Beckett

== Honours ==
Redmond was awarded an honorary Doctor of Letters degree by her alma mater, the University of St Andrews, in 2000. She was appointed Member of the Order of the British Empire (MBE) in the 2013 New Year Honours for services to drama.
