= Stephen Fry: 50 Not Out =

Stephen Fry: 50 Not Out was a one-off, one-hour documentary/biography about Stephen Fry released in 2007 by the BBC, celebrating Stephen Fry's fiftieth birthday.

There were many people who were interviewed to talk about Stephen, some of them were Clive Anderson, Sanjeev Bhaskar, Kenneth Branagh, Jo Brand, Russell Brand, Ronnie Corbett, Richard Curtis, Alan Davies, Ben Elton, Phill Jupitus, Hugh Laurie, Nigella Lawson, John Lloyd, Michael Parkinson, Prince Charles, Jonathan Ross, J. K. Rowling, John Sessions, Michael Sheen, Imelda Staunton, Nick Symons, Emma Thompson, Robert Webb.

The show was released as a part of a dedicated two nights of programming, called Stephen Fry Weekend to Fry on 17 and 18 August 2007. 50 Not Out was on the first night. There was also a second night which was composed of programs selected by Fry, as well as a 60-minute interview with Mark Lawson and a half-hour special, Stephen Fry: Guilty Pleasures.
