= Alfresco (TV series) =

British TV comedy sketch series (1983–1984)

- Cover of the DVD release
- Genre: Sketch comedy
- Starring: Robbie Coltrane; Ben Elton; Stephen Fry; Hugh Laurie; Siobhan Redmond; Emma Thompson
- Country of origin: United Kingdom
- Original language: English
- No. of series: 2
- No. of episodes: 13

Production
- Producer: Granada Television
- Running time: approx. 25 minutes

Original release
- Network: ITV
- Release: 1 May 1983 – 2 June 1984

Alfresco is a British sketch comedy television series starring Robbie Coltrane, Ben Elton, Stephen Fry, Hugh Laurie, Siobhan Redmond and Emma Thompson, produced by Granada Television and broadcast by ITV from 1 May 1983 to 2 June 1984. Running for two series, it totalled 13 episodes and was named Alfresco (from the Italian al fresco, meaning "in the fresh air") because, unusually for a comedy sketch show of the time, it was shot on location rather than in a studio.

== Production ==
The programme is a sketch show which was intended as an answer to the BBC's highly successful Not the Nine O'Clock News. The main writer was Ben Elton, with Fry and Laurie receiving writing credits by the second series. Of the original team, Tony Slattery was supposed to join the cast for the three-part pilot There's Nothing to Worry About! in 1982, but accepted an offer from Chris Tarrant to join Saturday Stayback, his follow-up to O.T.T.

After There's Nothing to Worry About!, which featured Elton, Fry, Laurie, Redmond, Thompson and Paul Shearer and was shown in the Granada region only, a first series of Alfresco was commissioned, broadcast nationally and replacing Shearer with Robbie Coltrane. The third of the seven transmitted episodes in 1983 was in fact a compilation show of the pilot series, featuring some additional material.

The sketches of the first series had a very odd and surreal mood to them. In the second series in 1984 the overall style changed slightly. A linking device in form of a "Pretend Pub" was created, and the sketches themselves were less dark than in the first series.

== Recurring characters ==
Though the programme is mostly composed of one-off sketches, a few characters appear over several episodes.

Ben Elton & Hugh Laurie as Mr. Butcher and Mr. Baker

=== Mr. Butcher and Mr. Baker ===
Elton and Laurie appear four times during the first series as two odd gentlemen in a strange cinematic black and white setting. They usually have a dialogue which relies heavily on wordplay, and Laurie does an obvious impression of Peter Cook in E. L. Wisty mode.

=== Alan & Bernard ===
Fry and Laurie appear four times during the first series as two young men discussing topics such as war prevention, a trendy cinema and the SAS. The characters appeared before on There's Nothing to Worry About! and the Cambridge Footlights Revue.

=== Doctor De Quincy ===
Fry appears twice as Doctor De Quincy, a character he also plays in the sitcom Happy Families in 1985, which was also written by Ben Elton.

=== Pretend Pub ===
The cast appear as crew and guests of a pretend pub, which serves as a linking device during the episodes of Series 2: Pretend pub landlord Bobzza (Coltrane), barmaid Shizza (Redmond), Lord Stezza (Fry), Huzza (Laurie), Bezza (Elton) and Ezza (Thompson).

== Reception ==
Mark Duguid, in the British Film Institute's Screenoline resource, described Alfresco as "a relatively minor, but not undistinguished, piece of the alternative comedy jigsaw". The Guardian wrote: "The comedy's more off-the-wall than Elton's later work (some two-handers with Hugh Laurie are almost Boosh-like), and there's a joyful, post-Python 'anything goes' spirit". The A.V. Club wrote: "Much of the humor in these 16 episodes is more conceptual than funny". PopMatters wrote: "Not quite an embarrassment to all concerned but rather frayed around the edges and of inconsistent quality, only fans of the individuals concerned or '80s comedy completists need let their curiosity get the better of them."

== Episodes ==
Series	Episodes	Originally released	
Series	Episodes	First released	Last released
1	7	1 May 1983	12 June 1983
2	6	28 April 1984	2 June 1984

== Home release ==
DVD box sets containing all thirteen episodes, plus the three episodes of There's Nothing to Worry About as bonus features, have been released by Network in the United Kingdom (Region 2) and Acorn Media in North America (Region 1).
