= Paul Shearer =

English actor and journalist

- Born: Paul Shearer; Epsom, UK
- Education: St John's College, Cambridge
- Occupations: Actor, writer
- Spouse: Vicky Licorish (m. 1994)
- Children: 2 (1 deceased)

Paul Shearer is an English actor, best known for his roles in The Fast Show and The Russ Abbot Show. Together with Stephen Fry, Emma Thompson, and Hugh Laurie, Shearer was a member of the Cambridge University's Footlights ensemble which won the first ever Perrier Comedy Award in 1981. As of 2024, Shearer works as a property journalist.

== Personal life and education ==
Shearer attended Lancing College between 1973 and 1978. He graduated from St John's College, Cambridge in 1981 with a degree in computer science. After graduating he lived in a flat with Peter Cook and Hugh Laurie. He married actor Vicky Licorish in 1994. On 30 October 2024, their 25-year-old child Cal Shearer, who was transgender, non-binary and autistic, was found dead in their dorm room at St John's College, Oxford, in an apparent suicide by hanging.

== Footlights ==
On the Footlights committee, Shearer held the position of "Club Falconer", which, according to Fry, "went back to the days when the Footlights were quartered in Falcon Yard." He partnered with Nick Hytner in a sketch Graffiti on the Wall. He also wrote for A Sense of Nonsense and The Cellar Tapes.

== Television ==
A selection of television appearances include:

Year	Title	Channel	Notes
1982	There's Nothing to Worry About!	ITV (Granada)	With Ben Elton, Emma Thompson, Hugh Laurie, Stephen Fry. Shearer was replaced by Robbie Coltrane after the first series.
1983	The Crystal Cube	BBC	Pilot
1983 – 1985	CBTV	Presenter	
1984	Jigsaw		
1986	Chocky's Challenge		
1987 – 1989	The Russ Abbot Show	BBC	Sketch show
1989	Anything More Would Be Greedy	ITV	Comedy-drama mini-series
1991	Five Children and It	BBC	Children's drama
1991	Birds of a Feather		
1992	Tales from the Poop Deck	ITV	Children's sitcom
1992	The South Bank Show s.15 e.13 "Douglas Adams"		Played 'Electric Monk' during fictional sequences in interview with author Douglas Adams
1994 – 1997	The Fast Show	BBC	Sketch show
1995	Proud Love	ITV	Sitcom
1995 – 1996	Cone Zone	ITV	Children's sitcom
1998	Stressed Eric	BBC Two	Comedy animation
2003	CBeebies	BBC Two	
2006	The Message	BBC Three	Sketch show
2020	The Fast Show: Just a Load of Blooming Catchphrases	Gold	

Also, Les Dennis Laughter Show, Abracadabra – children's comedy, CHBC, The Max Headroom Show and Who Dares Wins.

== Film ==
- 1997: Bring Me the Head of Mavis Davis
- 1997: The Man Who Knew Too Little

== Radio ==
Year	Title	Channel
1985	Ninety-ninety four	BBC Radio 4
1985	The Fosdyke Saga III	BBC Radio 2
1986	The World at Once Upon a Time	BBC Radio 4
1988 – 1991	Gorham and Swift	BBC Radio 2
1991	Week Ending	BBC Radio 4
1995	In the Red	BBC Radio 4
1995	Next of Kin	BBC One
1996	Chambers	BBC Radio 4
2011	Cabin Pressure	BBC Radio 4
2015	The Lentil Sorters	BBC Radio 4
2015 – 2017	Cracking Up	BBC Radio 4

== Theatre ==
- 1988: Snow White and the Seven Dwarves at Cambridge Arts Theatre
- 1991: Teechers at Duke's Theatre

== Writing ==
Shearer was a writer on the following shows:

- 1982: There's Nothing to Worry About
- 1983 – 1984: Alfresco
- 1985: Once Upon a Time... BBC Radio 4
- 1994: The Fast Show
- 1994: Nice Day at the Office – sitcom for BBC
- 1995: If You're So Clever, Why Aren't You Rich? – Radio 4 comedy
- 1999 – 2001: See It Saw It children's game show for BBC One
- 2011: Kees & Co

As a property journalist Shearer has written for The Financial Times, The Times and France Magazine.

== See also ==
- Fry, Stephen The Fry Chronicles (2011) Pub. Penguin ISBN 0-7181-5791-5
