= Hugh Laurie =

English actor, comedian, and musician (born 1959)

Hugh Laurie CBE
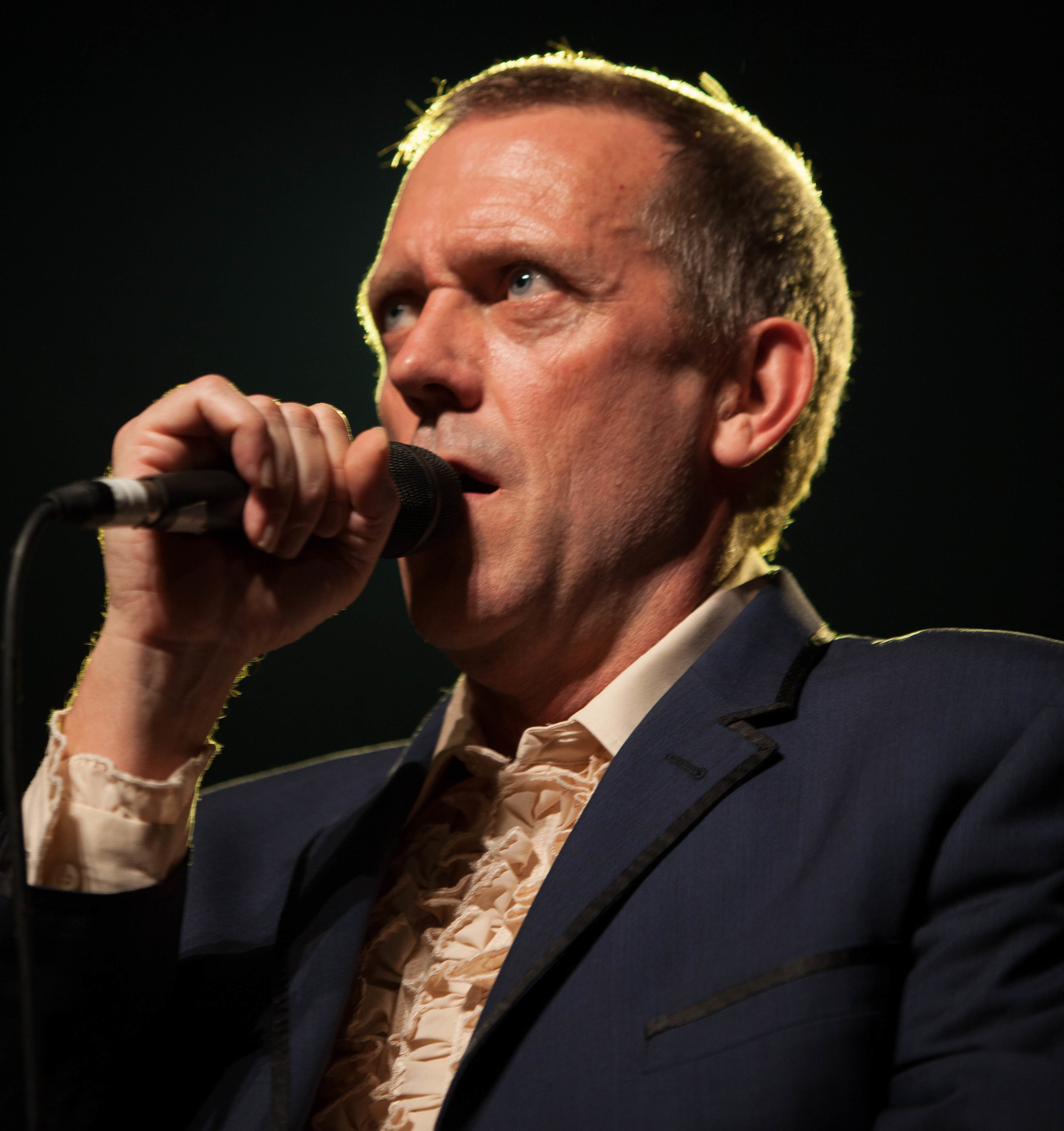
- Laurie singing at the 2012 Montreux Jazz Festival
- Born: James Hugh Calum Laurie; 11 June 1959 (age 67); Blackbird Leys, Oxford, England
- Education: University of Cambridge (BA)
- Occupations: Actor; comedian; musician
- Years active: 1981–present
- Works: Full list
- Spouse: Jo Green (m. 1989)
- Children: 3
- Father: Ran Laurie
- Musical career
- Genre: Blues
- Instruments: Vocals; piano; guitar; harmonica; drums; saxophone
- Label: Warner Records
- Hugh Laurie's voice Recorded June 2013 from the BBC Radio 4 show Desert Island Discs

James Hugh Calum Laurie (/ˈlɒri/; born 11 June 1959) is an English actor, comedian, and musician. Laurie first gained professional recognition as a member of the English comedy double act Fry and Laurie with Stephen Fry. Fry and Laurie acted together in several projects during the 1980s and 1990s, including the BBC sketch comedy series A Bit of Fry & Laurie and the P. G. Wodehouse adaptation Jeeves and Wooster. From 1986 to 1989, Laurie appeared in three series of the period comedy Blackadder.

From 2004 to 2012, Laurie starred as Dr. Gregory House in the Fox medical drama series House. He received two Golden Globe Awards and many other accolades for his work on House. He was listed in the 2011 Guinness World Records as the most-watched leading man on television and was one of the highest-paid actors in a television drama at the time. After House, Laurie won a Golden Globe for his starring role as arms dealer Richard Onslow Roper, the main antagonist in the TV series The Night Manager (2016–present). He received his 10th Emmy Award nomination for his portrayal of Senator Tom James in the HBO sitcom Veep (2015–2019).

Laurie released the blues albums Let Them Talk (2011) and Didn't It Rain (2013), both to favourable reviews. Laurie also wrote the novel The Gun Seller (1996). He was appointed Officer of the Order of the British Empire (OBE) in the 2007 New Year Honours and CBE in the 2018 New Year Honours, both for services to drama.

== Early life and education ==
Laurie was born on 11 June 1959, in the Blackbird Leys area of Oxford, England. He is the youngest of four children of Patricia (née Laidlaw) (1917–1990) and William George Ranald Mundell "Ran" Laurie (1915–1998), who was a physician and winner of an Olympic gold medal in the coxless pairs (rowing) at the 1948 London Games. He has an older brother, Charles Alexander Lyon Mundell Laurie, and two older sisters, Susan and Janet. Laurie had a strained relationship with his mother, whom he described as "Presbyterian by character, by mood". He later said, "I was frustration to her. She didn't like me."

Laurie's parents, who were both of Scottish descent, attended St Columba's Presbyterian Church (now United Reformed Church) in Oxford. He notes that "belief in God didn't play a large role" in his home, but "a certain attitude to life and the living of it did". He followed this by stating, "Pleasure was something that was treated with great suspicion, pleasure was something that... I was going to say it had to be earned, but even the earning of it didn't really work. It was something to this day, I mean, I carry that with me. I find pleasure a difficult thing; I don't know what you do with it, I don't know where to put it." He later stated, "I don't believe in God, but I have this idea that if there were a God, or destiny of some kind looking down on us, that if he saw you taking anything for granted, he'd take it away.

Laurie was brought up in Oxford and attended the Dragon School from seven to 13, later stating, "I was, in truth, a horrible child. Not much given to things of a 'bookey' nature, I spent a large part of my youth smoking Number Six and cheating in French vocabulary tests." He went on to Eton College, which he described as "the most private of private schools".

Laurie enrolled at Selwyn College, Cambridge, in 1978, which he says he attended "as a result of family tradition" since his father went there. Like his father, Laurie rowed at school and university. He has noted that his father was a successful rower at Cambridge and that he was "trying to follow in [his] father's footsteps". In 1977, he was a member of the junior coxed pair that won the British national title before representing Britain's Youth Team at the 1977 Junior World Rowing Championships. In 1980, Laurie and his rowing partner, J.S. Palmer, were runners-up in the Silver Goblets coxless pairs for Eton Vikings rowing club. He also achieved a Blue while taking part in the 1980 Oxford and Cambridge Boat Race. Cambridge lost that year by five feet. During this time, Laurie was training for up to eight hours a day and was on course to become an Olympic-standard rower. He is a member of the Leander Club, one of the oldest rowing clubs in the world, and was a member of the Hermes Club and Hawks' Club. Laurie studied archaeology and anthropology at Cambridge, specialising in social anthropology. He graduated with third-class honours in 1981.

== Career ==
=== Comedy and acting ===
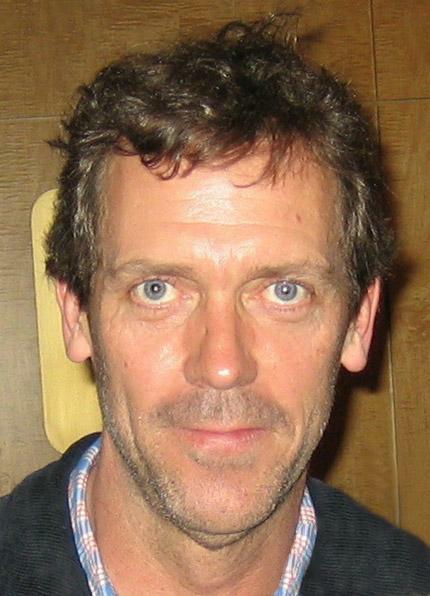
Laurie in 2005

Forced to abandon rowing during a bout of glandular fever, Laurie joined the Cambridge Footlights, a university dramatic club that has produced many well-known actors and comedians, including members of the popular British surreal comedy group, Monty Python. There he met Emma Thompson, with whom he had a romantic relationship; the two remain good friends. She introduced him to his future comedy partner, Stephen Fry. Laurie, Fry, and Thompson later parodied themselves in the sitcom The Young Ones. In the episode "Bambi", they and the series' co-writer Ben Elton appear on University Challenge as representatives of "Footlights College, Oxbridge".

In 1980–81, his final year at university, besides rowing, Laurie was president of the Footlights, with Thompson as vice-president. They took their annual revue, The Cellar Tapes, to the Edinburgh Fringe Festival and won the first Perrier Comedy Award, which was presented to them by Rowan Atkinson. The revue was written principally by Laurie and Fry, and the cast also included Thompson, Tony Slattery, Paul Shearer, and Penny Dwyer. The Perrier Award led to a West End transfer for The Cellar Tapes and a television version of the revue, broadcast in May 1982. It resulted in Laurie, Fry, and Thompson being selected, along with Ben Elton, Robbie Coltrane, and Siobhan Redmond, to write and appear in a new sketch comedy show for Granada Television, Alfresco, which ran for two series.

Fry and Laurie worked together on various projects throughout the 1980s and 1990s. Among them was the sitcom Blackadder, written by Ben Elton and Richard Curtis and starring Rowan Atkinson. Laurie first appeared in the last two episodes of the second series, Blackadder II, debuting as Blackadder's drunken friend Simon Partridge in the episode "Beer", and then as the villainous Prince Ludwig the Indestructible in the episode "Chains". Laurie joined the main cast for the third series, Blackadder the Third, where he played Prince George, followed by the fourth and final series, Blackadder Goes Forth, where he portrayed Lieutenant George. Other collaborations with Fry included their BBC sketch comedy series A Bit of Fry & Laurie, as well as Jeeves and Wooster, a television adaptation of P. G. Wodehouse's stories, in which Laurie played Jeeves's employer, the amiable twit Bertie Wooster. The pair also appeared together in a long-running series of television adverts for the Alliance & Leicester Building Society, beginning in the late 1980s. The campaign ran to eight commercials between 1987 and 1991 and was recognised at the IPA effectivemeness awards. He and Fry also participated in charity stage events, such as Hysteria! 1, 2 & 3, Amnesty International's The Secret Policeman's Third Ball, the Comic Relief TV shows, and the variety show Fry and Laurie Host a Christmas Night with the Stars. They collaborated again on the film Peter's Friends (1992) and came together for a retrospective show in 2010 titled Fry and Laurie Reunited.

Laurie starred in the Thames Television film Letters from a Bomber Pilot (1985), directed by David Hodgson. This was a serious acting role, the film being dramatised from the letters home of Pilot Officer J.R.A. "Bob" Hodgson, a pilot in RAF Bomber Command, who was killed in action in 1943.

Laurie appeared in the music videos for the 1986 single "Experiment IV" by Kate Bush, and the 1992 Annie Lennox single "Walking on Broken Glass" in British Regency period costume alongside John Malkovich. Laurie appeared in the Spice Girls' film Spice World (1997) and had a brief guest-starring role on Friends in "The One with Ross's Wedding" (1998).

Laurie's later film appearances include Sense and Sensibility (1995), adapted by and starring Emma Thompson; the Disney live-action film 101 Dalmatians (1996), where he played Jasper, one of the bumbling criminals hired to kidnap the puppies; Elton's adaptation of his novel Inconceivable, Maybe Baby (2000); Girl from Rio; the 2004 adaptation of The Flight of the Phoenix, and Stuart Little.

Since 2002, Laurie has appeared in a range of British television dramas, guest-starring that year in two episodes of the first series of the spy thriller series Spooks on BBC One. In 2003, he starred in and also directed ITV's comedy-drama series fortysomething (in one episode of which Stephen Fry appears). In 2001, he voiced the character of a bar patron in the Family Guy episode "One If by Clam, Two If by Sea". Laurie voiced the character of Mr. Wolf in the cartoon Preston Pig. He was a panellist on the first episode of QI, alongside Fry as host. In 2004, Laurie guest-starred on The Lenny Henry Show.

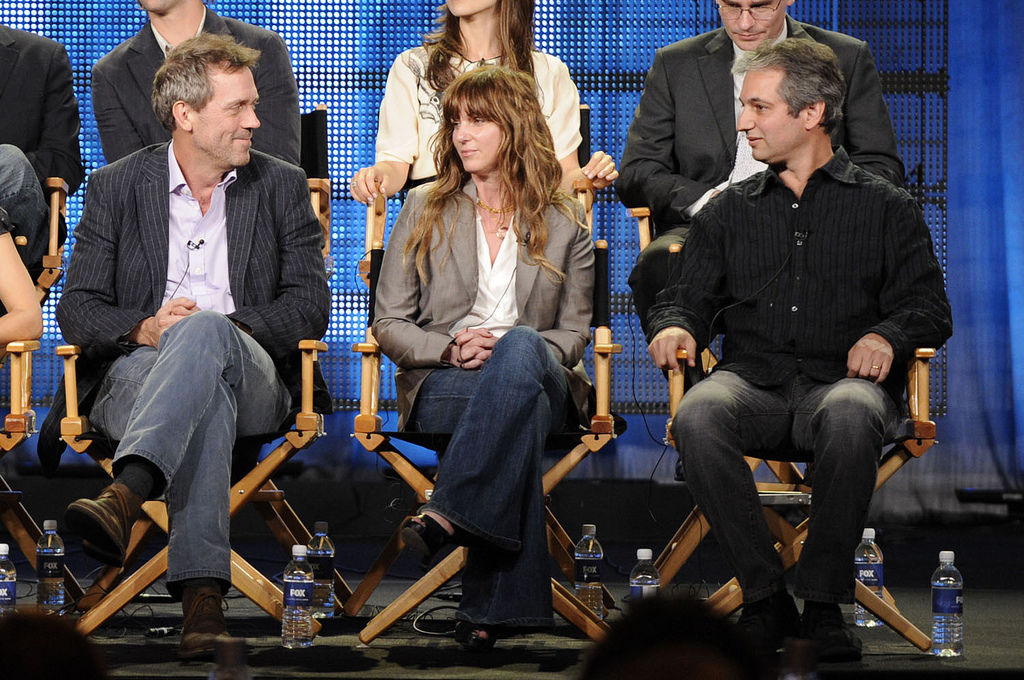
Laurie with House, MD executive producers Katie Jacobs and David Shore in 2009

Between 2004 and 2012, Laurie starred as an acerbic physician specialising in diagnostic medicine, Dr. Gregory House, in the Fox medical drama House. For his portrayal, he assumed an American accent. He was in Namibia filming Flight of the Phoenix and recorded his audition tape for the show in the bathroom of the hotel, as it was the only place he could get enough light. Jacob Vargas operated the camera for the audition tape. Laurie's American accent was so convincing that executive producer Bryan Singer, who was unaware at the time that Laurie was British, pointed to him as an example of just the kind of "compelling American actor" he had been looking for. Laurie also adopted the accent between takes on the set of House, as well as during script read-throughs, although he used his native accent when directing the episode "Lockdown". He also served as director for the episode "The C-Word".

Laurie was nominated for an Emmy Award for his role in House in 2005. Although he did not win, he did receive a Golden Globe in both 2006 and 2007 for his work on the series and the Screen Actors Guild award in 2007 and 2009. Laurie was also awarded a large increase in salary, from what was rumoured to be a mid-range five-figure sum to $350,000 per episode. Laurie was not nominated for the 2006 Emmys, apparently to the outrage of Fox executives, but he still appeared in a scripted, pre-taped intro, where he parodied his House character by rapidly diagnosing host Conan O'Brien and then proceeding to grope him as the latter asked him for help to get to the Emmys on time. He would later go on to speak in French while presenting an Emmy with Dame Helen Mirren, and was nominated in 2007, 2008, 2009, 2010, and 2011.

Laurie was initially cast as Perry White, the editor of the Daily Planet, in Singer's film Superman Returns, but had to bow out of the project because of his commitment to House. In 2006, Laurie appeared on Inside the Actors Studio, where he also performed one of his own comic songs, "Mystery", accompanying himself on the piano. He hosted NBC's Saturday Night Live, in which he appeared in drag in a sketch with Kenan Thompson about a man with a broken leg who accuses his doctor of being dishonest. Laurie played the man's wife.

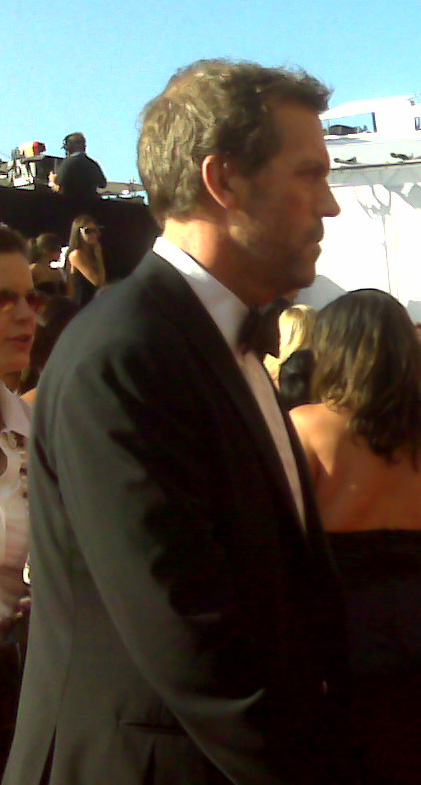
Hugh Laurie at the 59th Primetime Emmy Awards in September 2007

In 2007, Laurie appeared on BBC Four's documentary Stephen Fry: 50 Not Out, filmed in celebration of Fry's 50th birthday. In 2008, he took part in Blackadder Rides Again, which saw him reuniting with former Blackadder producer, John Lloyd, who had travelled to the set of House MD in Hollywood, Los Angeles, California, to interview Laurie, who recalled his time working on the Blackadder series. Laurie also appeared as Captain James Biggs in Street Kings, opposite Keanu Reeves and Forest Whitaker, and then in 2009 as the eccentric Dr. Herbert Cockroach, PhD in DreamWorks' Monsters vs. Aliens. He also hosted Saturday Night Live for the second time on the Christmas show, in which he sang a medley of three-second Christmas songs to close his monologue. In 2009, Laurie returned to guest star in another Family Guy episode, "Business Guy", parodying Gregory House. In 2010, Laurie guest-starred in The Simpsons episode "Treehouse of Horror XXI" as Roger, a castaway who is planning a murder scheme on a ship during Homer and Marge's second honeymoon.

Laurie was listed in the 2011 Guinness World Records as the most-watched leading man on television and was one of the highest-paid actors in a television drama at the time.

House ended in 2012 after an eight-series run. That same year, the media announced that Laurie was in negotiations to play the villain in RoboCop, a remake of the original RoboCop film. These negotiations ultimately fell through, and Laurie passed on the project. In 2012, Laurie starred in an independent feature called The Oranges that had a limited release. The Star-Ledger of Newark, New Jersey, thought that he was "particularly good". After the end of House, Laurie took a three-year hiatus from film and TV work.

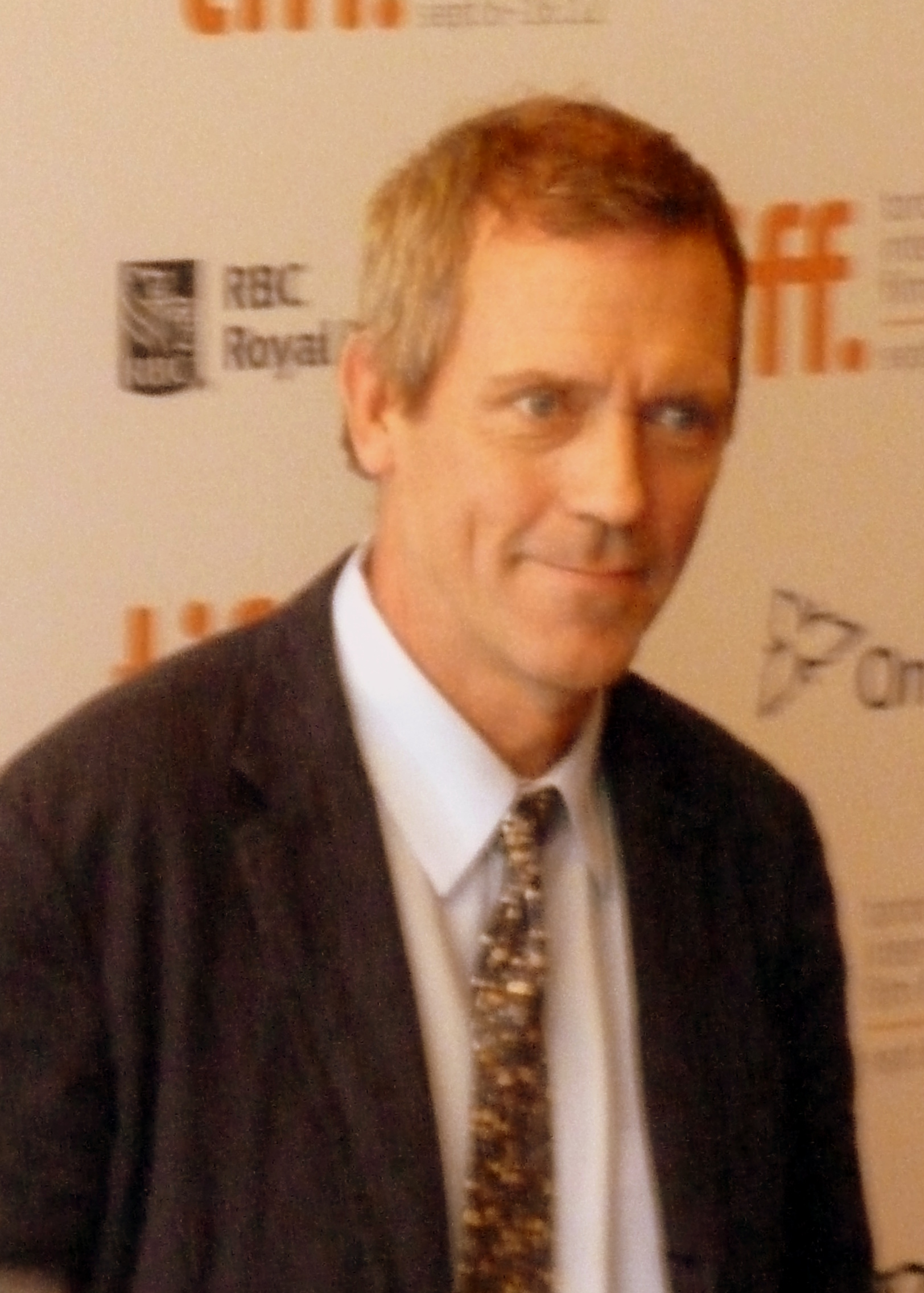
Laurie in 2012

Laurie was in negotiations to be cast in the role of Blackbeard for the 2014 series Crossbones. However, the role went to John Malkovich. In 2015, he returned to TV work with a recurring role on Veep as Tom James, a role written specifically for him after showrunner Armando Iannucci heard he was a fan of the show. Laurie continued to recur on the show until the final series in 2019. For his work on Veep, he received his 10th Emmy nomination in 2017.

Laurie played the villain David Nix in Brad Bird's 2015 film Tomorrowland.

Laurie played arms dealer Richard Onslow Roper in the BBC One miniseries The Night Manager. The series started filming in spring 2015 and aired first on the BBC. He was nominated for two Emmys for his work on the miniseries and won the Golden Globe Award for Best Supporting Actor – Series, Miniseries or Television Film. In addition to being an executive producer on the show alongside Tom Hiddleston, it was also Laurie's first role on British TV in thirteen years. He returned to the role for the second series of The Night Manager in 2026.

Laurie starred as Dr Eldon Chance, a San Francisco-based forensic neuropsychiatrist in the Hulu thriller series Chance, which lasted for two series from 2016 to 2017. In 2018, Laurie had a small role in the critically panned film Holmes & Watson.

In 2019, Laurie appeared in Veep creator Armando Iannucci's film The Personal History of David Copperfield, an adaptation of the novel David Copperfield by Charles Dickens. That same year, it was announced he would also work with Iannucci on the upcoming space comedy Avenue 5 for HBO. series 2 of Avenue 5 was released on 10 October 2022, with Laurie reprising his role as Captain Ryan.

Laurie starred as Eric Peterson in the third series of Tehran in 2024.

Laurie is slated to headline a thriller drama called The Wanted Man for Apple TV+, portraying crime lord Felix Carmichael. Laurie was announced as the voice of Albus Dumbledore in Harry Potter: The Full-Cast Audio Editions from Audible and Pottermore Publishing. The first audiobook in the series was released on November 4th, 2025. In December 2025, Deadline reported that Laurie has been tapped for the role of Neville, a British archaeology professor, in the new Amy Poehler and Mike Schur comedy TV series Dig. Laurie is set to join the BBC and MGM+ series Legacy of Spies which will be based on John Le Carré's George Smiley novels in a mystery role.

=== Music ===
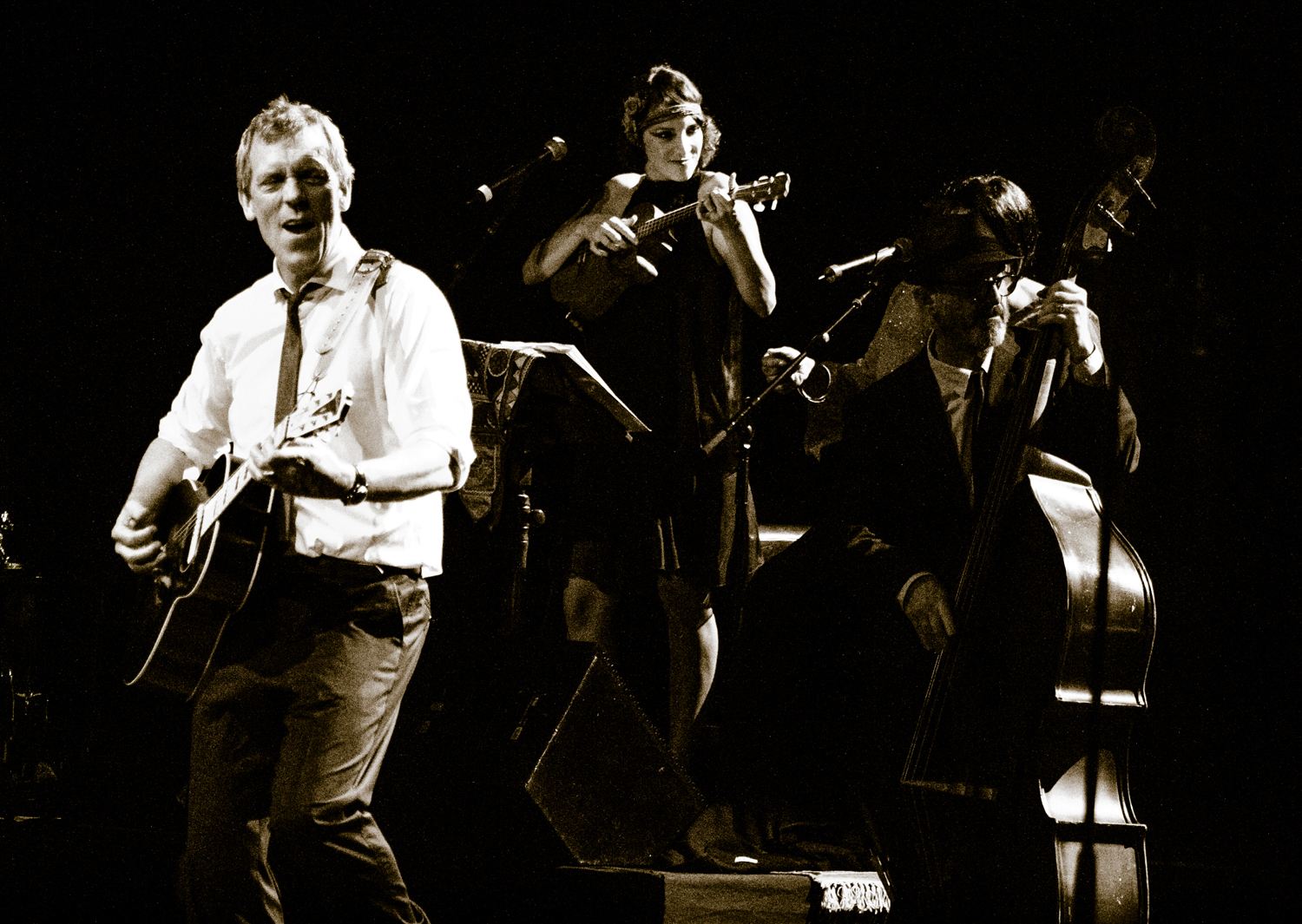
Hugh Laurie playing with his jazz band at Belo Horizonte, Brazil, in 2014

Laurie is an accomplished pianist who began taking piano lessons at the age of six. He sings and plays the piano, guitar, drums, harmonica, and saxophone. He has displayed his musical talents throughout his acting career, such as on A Bit of Fry & Laurie, Jeeves and Wooster, House, and his appearance as host of Saturday Night Live in October 2006. He is a vocalist and keyboard player for the Los Angeles charity rock group Band From TV.

Following Meat Loaf's appearance in the House episode "Simple Explanation", Laurie played piano as a special guest on the song "If I Can't Have You" in Meat Loaf's 2010 album Hang Cool Teddy Bear. Laurie co-wrote and performed the humorous blues song, "Sperm Test in the Morning", in the film Maybe Baby.

On House Laurie played several classic rock 'n roll instruments including Gibson Flying V and Les Paul guitars, as well as piano and Hammond B-3 organ.

On 26 July 2010, it was announced that Laurie would be releasing a blues album after signing a contract with Warner Bros. Records. The album, called Let Them Talk, was released in France on 18 April 2011 and in Germany on 29 April. The album features collaborations from well-known artists such as Tom Jones, Irma Thomas and Dr. John.

On 1 May 2011, Laurie and a jazz quintet closed the 2011 Cheltenham Jazz Festival to great acclaim. He followed that up as the subject of the 15 May 2011 episode of ITV's series Perspectives, explaining his love for the music of New Orleans and playing music, from his album Let Them Talk, at studios and live venues in the city itself. He was the subject of PBS Great Performances Let them Talk, also about New Orleans jazz, first broadcast on 30 September 2011.

His second album, Didn't It Rain, was released in the UK on 6 May 2013. In the same year he played at the RMS Queen Mary together with his band. This concert was filmed and later released as Live on the Queen Mary on DVD and Blu-ray.

=== Writing ===
In 1996 Laurie's first novel, The Gun Seller, an intricate thriller laced with Wodehouseian humour, was published and became a best-seller.

== Personal life ==
Laurie married theatre administrator Jo Green on 16 June 1989 in the Camden area of London. They have three children. Laurie's elder son played a small role as baby William in A Bit of Fry & Laurie, during a sketch titled "Special Squad". His daughter had a role in the film Wit as five-year-old Vivian Bearing. Stephen Fry, Laurie's best friend and long-time comedy partner, was the best man at his wedding and is the godfather of his children. They mostly live in London. In 2008, he bought a house in Hollywood Hills, California.

Laurie's mother died from motor neurone disease in 1989, at the age of 73. According to Laurie, she endured the disease for two years and suffered "painful, plodding paralysis" while being cared for by Laurie's father, whom he has called "the sweetest man in the whole world".

While appearing on Inside the Actors Studio in 2006, Laurie discussed his struggles with severe clinical depression. He told host James Lipton that he first concluded he had a problem while driving in a charity demolition derby, during which he realised that seeing two cars collide and explode made him feel bored rather than excited or frightened; he quipped that "boredom is not an appropriate response to exploding cars".

Laurie admires the writings of P. G. Wodehouse, explaining in a 1999 article in The Daily Telegraph that reading Wodehouse novels had "saved his life". In an interview also in The Daily Telegraph, he confirmed that he is an atheist. He is an avid motorcycle enthusiast and has two motorbikes, one at his London home and one at his Los Angeles home. His bike in the U.S. is a Triumph Bonneville, his self-proclaimed "feeble attempt to fly the British flag".

In 2013, Laurie was the guest on BBC Radio 4's Desert Island Discs, where he chose tracks from Joe Cocker, Sister Rosetta Tharpe, Randy Newman, Professor Longhair, Son House, Nina Simone, Lester Young–Buddy Rich Trio, and Van Morrison as his eight favourite discs. This was his second appearance on the show, having previously been on a 1996 episode, where he chose tracks by Muddy Waters, Max Bruch, the Rolling Stones, Frank Sinatra with Count Basie, Ian Dury and the Blockheads, Erich Wolfgang Korngold, Van Morrison and Dr. John.

Laurie is a supporter of Arsenal F.C. In 1993, he appeared with Stephen Fry and Michelle Collins in a party political broadcast for the Labour Party.

== Recognition ==
Laurie has won three Golden Globe Awards and two Screen Actors Guild Awards, and has been nominated for 10 Primetime Emmy Awards.

Laurie was appointed Officer of the Order of the British Empire (OBE) for services to drama in the 2007 New Year Honours. He was promoted to Commander of the same Order (CBE) for his services to drama in the 2018 New Year Honours.

In 2012, Laurie was made an Honorary Fellow of his alma mater Selwyn College, Cambridge.

In 2016, he was awarded a star on the Hollywood Walk of Fame.

== Discography ==
=== Albums ===
List of albums with selected details, chart positions and certifications
Title	Album details	Peak chart positions										Certifications (sales thresholds)
Title	Album details	UK	AUS	AUT	FRA	GER	IRE	NL	NZ	SWI	US	Certifications (sales thresholds)
Let Them Talk	Released: 18 April 2011; Label: Warner Bros. Records; Formats: CD, vinyl, digital download	2	37	1	2	8	14	25	26	4	16	BPI: Gold; SNEP: 2× Platinum
Didn't It Rain	Released: 6 May 2013; Label: Warner Bros. Records; Formats: CD, vinyl, digital download	3	35	10	3	41	21	32	22	3	21	BPI: Silver; SNEP: Gold

=== Singles ===
List of singles, with selected chart positions
Title	Year	Peak chart positions			Album
Title	Year	UK	AUT	BEL (WA)	Album
"You Don't Know My Mind"	2011	164	47	20	Let Them Talk
"Hallelujah, I Love Her So"	2011	—	—	—	Let Them Talk
"Wild Honey"	2013	—	—	36	Didn't It Rain

=== Featured singles ===
List of singles as featured artist, with selected chart positions
Title	Year	Peak chart positions		Album
Title	Year	UK	NL Top 40	Album
"Stick It Out" (Right Said Fred and Friends)	1993	4	48	—N/a
"If I Can't Have You" (Meat Loaf, featuring Kara DioGuardi & Hugh Laurie)	2010	—	—	Hang Cool Teddy Bear

=== Other charting songs ===
List of other charting songs, with selected chart positions
Title	Year	Peak chart positions			Album
Title	Year	CAN	FRA	US	Album
"St James' Infirmary"	2011	—	92	—	Let Them Talk
"Police Dog Blues"	2011	39	—	58	Let Them Talk
"Guess I'm a Fool"	2011	—	67	—	Let Them Talk
"Unchain My Heart"	2013	—	86	—	Didn't It Rain
"Louisiana Blues"	2013	—	96	—	Didn't It Rain
"The St. Louis Blues"	2013	—	133	—	Didn't It Rain

=== Music videos ===
List of music video appearances
Year	Artist	Song	Album
1986	Kate Bush	Video for "Experiment IV"	The Whole Story
1992	Annie Lennox	Video for "Walking on Broken Glass"	Diva

=== DVDs/Blu-ray ===
List of DVD/Blu-ray releases
Year	DVD/Blu-ray	Notes
2013	Live on the Queen Mary	Recorded live 2013 on the RMS Queen Mary together with band

== Awards and honours ==
=== Commonwealth honours ===
Date	Appointment	Post-nominal letters
2007–2018	Officer of the Order of the British Empire	OBE
2018–present	Commander of the Order of the British Empire	CBE

=== Scholastic ===
University degrees

Date	School	Degree
1982	Selwyn College, Cambridge	Third Class Honours Bachelor of Arts (B.A.) in Archaeology and Anthropology

Chancellor, visitor, governor, rector and fellowships

Date	School	Position
July 2018 – present	Royal Academy of Music	Honorary Member
11 July 2020 – present	Selwyn College, Cambridge	Honorary Fellow

== See also ==
- List of atheists in film, radio, television and theatre
