= Emma Thompson on screen and stage =

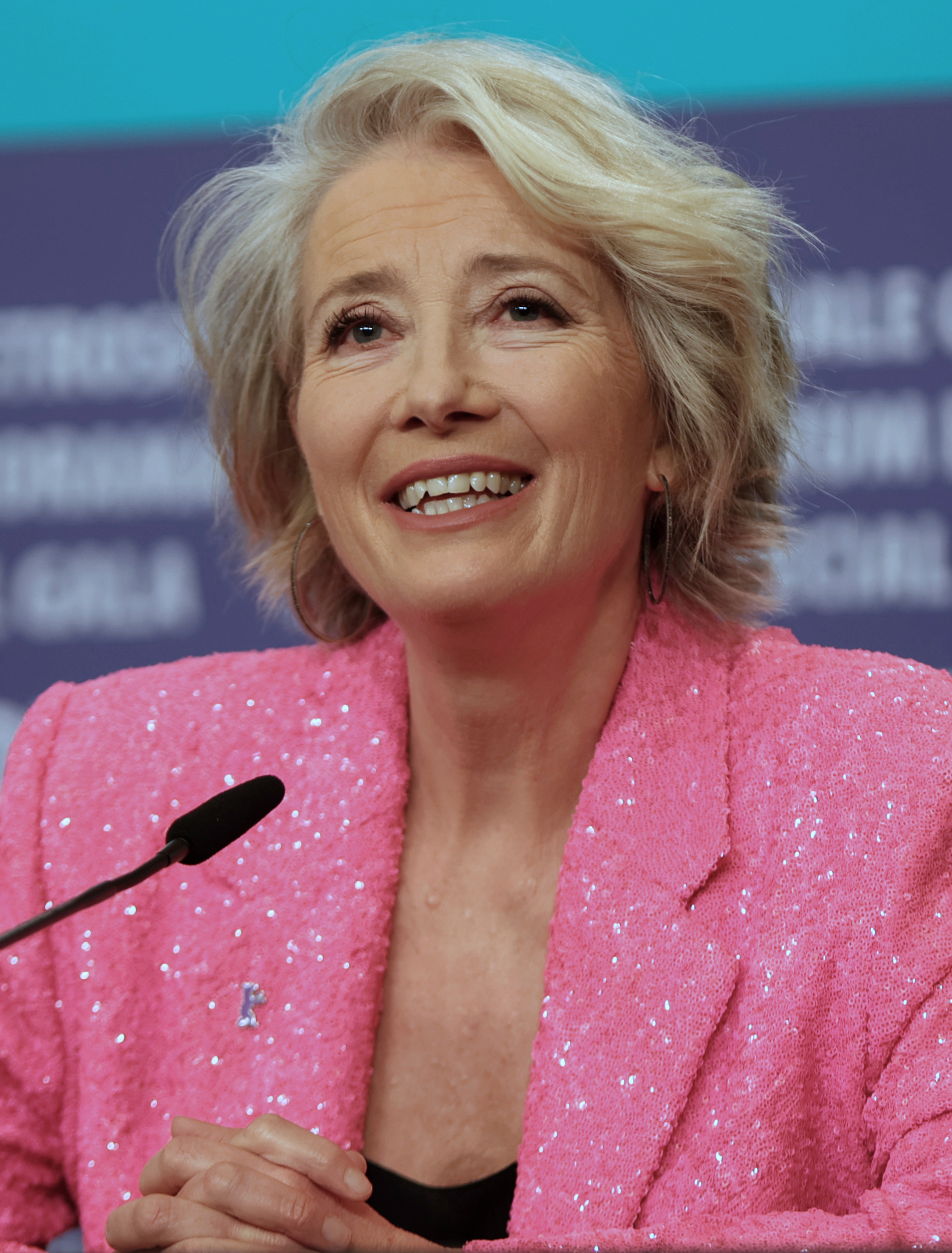
Thompson at the 2022 Berlin International Film Festival

British actress Dame Emma Thompson has appeared in many films, television programmes and stage productions. She has won and been nominated for many awards during her career, including five Academy Award nominations (winning two), nine Golden Globe Award nominations (winning two), seven BAFTA Award nominations (winning three), and six Emmy Award nominations (winning one).

She first came to prominence in 1987 in two BBC TV series, Tutti Frutti and Fortunes of War, winning the BAFTA TV Award for Best Actress for her work in both series. Her first film role was in the 1989 romantic comedy The Tall Guy, and in the early 1990s, she and her then husband, actor and director Kenneth Branagh co-starred in several films, including Dead Again (1991) and Much Ado About Nothing (1993).

In 1992, Thompson won an Academy Award and a BAFTA Award for Best Actress for the period drama Howards End. In 1993, she garnered dual Academy Award nominations for her roles in The Remains of the Day as the housekeeper of a grand household and In the Name of the Father as a lawyer. Thompson scripted and starred in Sense and Sensibility (1995), which earned her numerous awards. In 2013, she received acclaim and several award nominations for her portrayal of author P. L. Travers in Saving Mr. Banks. Other notable film and television credits include the Harry Potter film series (2004–2011), Wit (2001), Love Actually (2003), Angels in America (2003), Nanny McPhee (2005), Stranger than Fiction (2006), Last Chance Harvey (2008), Men in Black 3 (2012), Brave (2012), A Walk in the Woods (2015), Bridget Jones's Baby (2016), Beauty and the Beast (2017), Late Night (2019), Years and Years written by Russell T. Davies (2019) and Cruella (2021).

== Film ==
Year	Film	Role	Director	Notes
1989	Henry V	Catherine of Valois	Kenneth Branagh	
1989	The Tall Guy	Kate Lemmon	Mel Smith	
1991	Dead Again	Grace / Margaret Strauss	Kenneth Branagh	
1991	Impromptu	Claudette, Duchess d'Antan	James Lapine	
1992	Howards End	Margaret Schlegel	James Ivory	
1992	Peter's Friends	Maggie Chester	Kenneth Branagh	
1993	Much Ado About Nothing	Beatrice	Kenneth Branagh	
1993	The Remains of the Day	Miss Kenton	James Ivory	
1993	In the Name of the Father	Gareth Peirce	Jim Sheridan	
1994	Junior	Diana Reddin	Ivan Reitman	
1995	Carrington	Dora Carrington	Christopher Hampton	
1995	Sense and Sensibility	Elinor Dashwood	Ang Lee	Also writer
1997	The Winter Guest	Frances	Alan Rickman	
1998	Primary Colors	Susan Stanton	Mike Nichols	
1998	Judas Kiss	Sadie Hawkins	Sebastian Gutierrez	
2000	Maybe Baby	Druscilla	Ben Elton	
2002	Treasure Planet	Captain Amelia (voice)	Ron Clements; John Musker	
2003	Imagining Argentina	Cecilia	Christopher Hampton	
2003	Love Actually	Karen	Richard Curtis	
2004	Harry Potter and the Prisoner of Azkaban	Professor Sybill Trelawney	Alfonso Cuarón	
2005	Nanny McPhee	Nanny McPhee	Kirk Jones	Also writer
2006	Stranger than Fiction	Karen Eiffel	Marc Forster	
2007	Harry Potter and the Order of the Phoenix	Professor Sybill Trelawney	David Yates	
2007	I Am Legend	Alice Krippin	Francis Lawrence	Uncredited
2008	Brideshead Revisited	Lady Marchmain	Julian Jarrold	
2008	Last Chance Harvey	Kate Walker	Joel Hopkins	
2009	An Education	Headmistress	Lone Scherfig	
2009	The Boat That Rocked	Charlotte	Richard Curtis	
2010	Nanny McPhee and the Big Bang	Nanny McPhee	Susanna White	Also writer; also known as Nanny McPhee Returns
2011	Harry Potter and the Deathly Hallows – Part 2	Professor Sybill Trelawney	David Yates	
2012	Men in Black 3	Agent O	Barry Sonnenfeld	
2012	Brave	Queen Elinor (voice)	Mark Andrews; Brenda Chapman	
2013	Beautiful Creatures	Mrs Lincoln / Sarafine	Richard LaGravenese	
2013	Saving Mr. Banks	P. L. Travers	John Lee Hancock	
2013	The Love Punch	Kate Jones	Joel Hopkins	
2014	Men, Women & Children	Narrator (voice)	Jason Reitman	
2014	Effie Gray	Lady Eastlake	Richard Laxton	Also writer
2015	A Walk in the Woods	Catherine Bryson	Ken Kwapis	
2015	The Legend of Barney Thomson	Cemolina	Robert Carlyle	
2015	Burnt	Dr Rosshilde	John Wells	
2016	Alone in Berlin	Anna Quangel	Vincent Perez	
2016	Bridget Jones's Baby	Doctor Rawlings	Sharon Maguire	Also writer
2016	The Doubt Machine: Inside the Koch Brothers' War on Climate Science	Narrator (voice)	Bruce Livesey	Documentary
2017	Beauty and the Beast	Mrs. Potts	Bill Condon	also voice
2017	Sea Sorrow	Sylvia Pankhurst	Vanessa Redgrave	
2017	The Meyerowitz Stories	Maureen	Noah Baumbach	
2017	The Children Act	Fiona Maye	Richard Eyre	
2018	Johnny English Strikes Again	The Prime Minister	David Kerr	
2019	Late Night	Katherine Newbury	Nisha Ganatra	
2019	Missing Link	Dora the Yeti Elder (voice)	Chris Butler	
2019	Men in Black: International	Agent O	F. Gary Gray	
2019	How to Build a Girl	Amanda Watson	Coky Giedroyc	
2019	Last Christmas	Petra Andrich	Paul Feig	Also writer and producer
2020	Dolittle	Polynesia (voice)	Stephen Gaghan	
2021	Cruella	Baroness von Hellman	Craig Gillespie	
2022	Good Luck to You, Leo Grande	Nancy Stokes	Sophie Hyde	
2022	What's Love Got to Do with It?	Cath	Shekhar Kapur	
2022	Matilda the Musical	Miss Trunchbull	Matthew Warchus	
2025	Bridget Jones: Mad About the Boy	Doctor Rawlings	Michael Morris	
2025	Dead of Winter	Barb	Brian Kirk	
2026	The Sheep Detectives	Lydia Harbottle	Kyle Balda	
2026	Everybody to Kenmure Street	Van man	Felipe Bustos Sierra	Also executive producer

== Television ==
Year	Title	Role	Notes
1982	Cambridge Footlights Revue	Various roles	TV special
1982	There's Nothing to Worry About!	Mrs Wally	3 episodes
1983–1984	Alfresco	Various roles	13 episodes
1984	The Comic Strip Presents	Young Woman	Episode: "Slags"
1984	The Young Ones	Miss Money-Sterling	Episode: "Bambi"
1985	Emma Thompson: Up for Grabs	Various	TV film
1987	Tutti Frutti	Suzi Kettles	Miniseries; 6 episodes
1987	Fortunes of War	Harriet Pringle	Miniseries; 7 episodes
1988	Thompson	Various roles	6 episodes
1989	Look Back in Anger	Alison Porter	TV film
1990	Knuckle	Jenny Wilbur	TV film
1990	The Winslow Boy	Catherine Winslow	TV film
1992	Cheers	Nanette Guzman ("Nanny G")	Episode: "One Hugs, the Other Doesn't"
1994	The Blue Boy	Marie Bonnar	TV film
1997	Ellen	Herself	Episode: "Emma"
1997	Hospital!	Elephant Woman	TV film
2001	Wit	Vivian Bearing	TV film; also writer
2003	Angels in America	Nurse Emily, Homeless Woman, The Angel America	Miniseries, 5 episodes
2009	QI	Herself	Series F, Episode: "Film"
2010	The Song of Lunch	She	TV film
2012	Walking the Dogs	Elizabeth II	TV film
2017	Upstart Crow	Elizabeth I	Episode: "A Christmas Crow"
2018	King Lear	Goneril	TV film
2019	Saturday Night Live	Herself (host)	Episode: "Emma Thompson/Jonas Brothers"
2019	Years and Years	Vivienne Rook MP	Miniseries, 6 episodes
2022	Why Didn't They Ask Evans?	Lady Marcham	Episode #1.1
2025	Down Cemetery Road	Zoë	TV series
2026	The Simpsons	Constance Clavinger (voice)	Episode: "The Children's Book Job"

== Stage ==
=== As actor ===
Year	Title	Role	Venue	Ref.
1982	Not the Nine O'Clock News		UK tour	
1982	Beyond the Footlights	Performer; Playwright	Lyric Theatre, London	
1984	Short Vehicle	Performer; Playwright	Edinburgh Festival	
1984–1985	Me and My Girl	Sally Smith	Leicester Haymarket Theatre; Adelphi Theatre, London	
1989	Look Back in Anger	Alison	Lyric Theatre, London	
1990	King Lear	Fool	Dominion Theatre, London; Renaissance Theatre Company; U.S. National Tour	
1990	A Midsummer Night's Dream	Helena	International tour	
2014–2015	Sweeney Todd: The Demon Barber of Fleet Street	Mrs. Lovett	Avery Fisher Hall, New York City; London Coliseum; English National Opera	
2022	Whodunnit Unrehearsed 2	The Inspector	Park Theatre (London)	

=== As writer ===
- Nanny McPhee (musical) - 2027 (with Gary Clark)

== See also ==
- List of awards and nominations received by Emma Thompson
- List of British actors
- List of Academy Award winners and nominees from Great Britain
- List of Academy Award records
- List of actors with Academy Award nominations
- List of actors with more than one Academy Award nomination in the acting categories
- List of Primetime Emmy Award winners
- List of Golden Globe winners
