= List of awards and nominations received by Emma Thompson =

Dame Emma Thompson awards and nominations
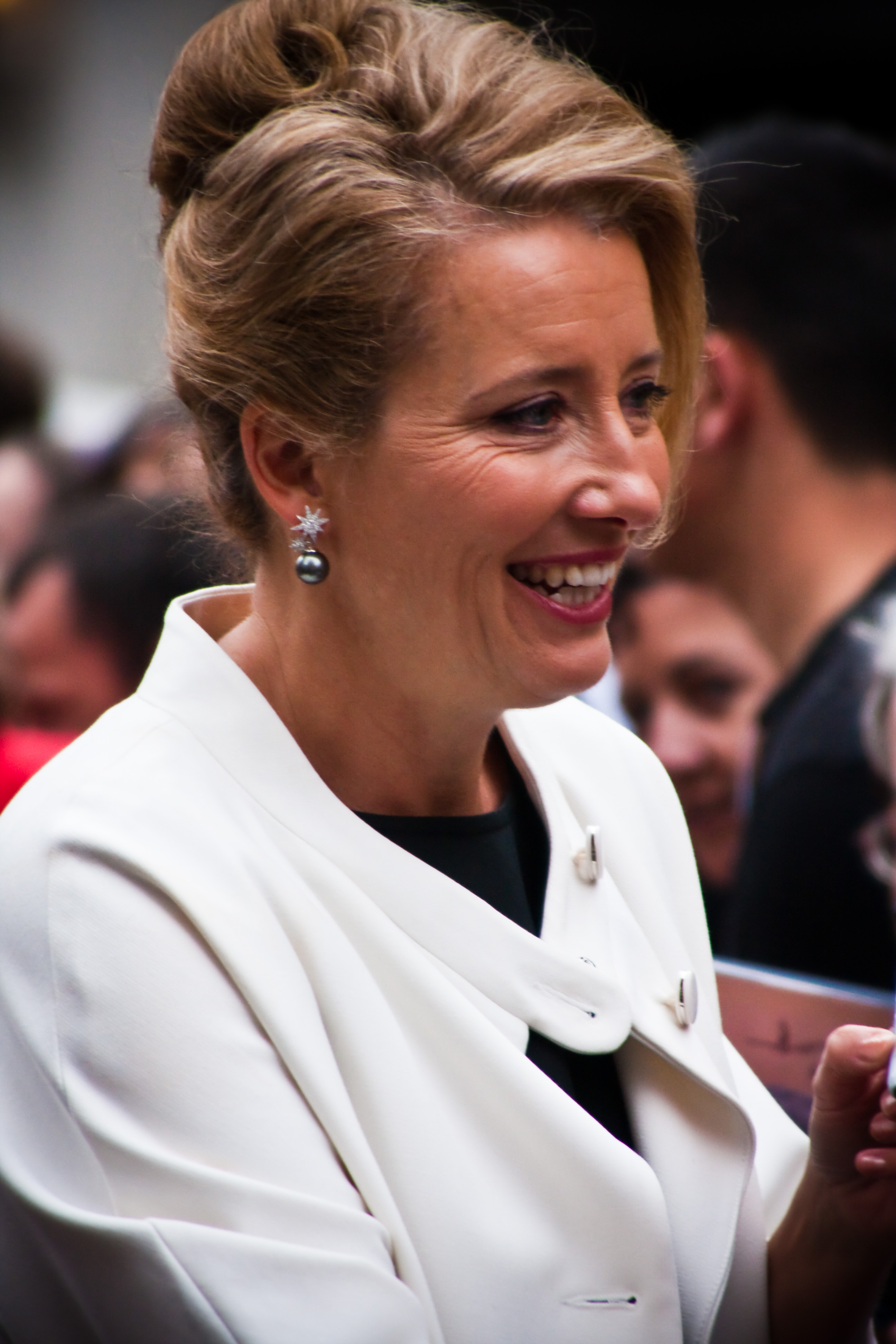
- Thompson at 2009 film premiere
Awards and nominations
Award	Wins	Nominations
Academy Awards	2	5
BAFTA Awards	3	8
Emmy Awards	1	7
Golden Globes	2	11
Grammy Awards	0	2
SAG Awards	0	6

Totals (Note: Certain award groups do not simply award one winner. They acknowledge several different recipients, have runners-up, and have third place. Since this is a specific recognition and is different from losing an award, runner-up mentions are considered wins in this award tally. For simplification and to avoid errors, each award in this list has been presumed to have had a prior nomination.)
- Wins: 38
- Nominations: 121

Dame Emma Thompson is a British actress and screenwriter known for her roles on stage and screen. She has received several awards throughout her career including two Academy Awards, three BAFTA Awards, two Golden Globe Awards, and one Primetime Emmy Award. She was made a Dame Commander of the Order of the British Empire (DBE) by Queen Elizabeth II in 2018 for her services to drama.

She is the only person in Academy Award history to win for both acting and writing, she won the Best Actress for playing Margaret Schlegel in the Merchant Ivory period drama Howards End (1992) and Best Adapted Screenplay for the Ang Lee directed Sense and Sensibility (1995). She is also one of 12 actors to have received two acting nominations in the same year. She was Oscar-nominated for playing a housemaid in The Remains of the Day (1993), Gareth Peirce in In the Name of the Father (1993), and Elinor Dashwood in Sense and Sensibility (1995).

For her work on television, she has received seven Emmy Award nominations, winning Outstanding Guest Actress in a Comedy Series for her guest spot on Ellen (1998). She was Emmy-nominated for playing professor with cancer in the HBO film Wit (2001), various roles in the HBO miniseries Angels in America (2003), a former lover in the BBC film The Song of Lunch (2010), Mrs. Lovett in a taping of Sweeney Todd: Live from Lincoln Center (2014), and as a host of Saturday Night Live (2019). She won the BAFTA Award for Best Actress for Fortunes of War / Tutti Frutti (1987).

== Major associations ==
=== Academy Awards ===
Year	Category	Nominated work	Result	Ref.
1992	Best Actress	Howards End	Won	
1993	Best Actress	The Remains of the Day	Nominated	
1993	Best Supporting Actress	In the Name of the Father	Nominated	
1995	Best Actress	Sense and Sensibility	Nominated	
1995	Best Adapted Screenplay	Sense and Sensibility	Won	

=== BAFTA Awards ===
Year	Category	Nominated work	Result	Ref.
British Academy Film Awards
1992	Best Actress in a Leading Role	Howards End	Won	
1993	Best Actress in a Leading Role	The Remains of the Day	Nominated	
1995	Best Actress in a Leading Role	Sense and Sensibility	Won	
1995	Best Adapted Screenplay	Sense and Sensibility	Nominated	
2003	Best Actress in a Supporting Role	Love Actually	Nominated	
2013	Best Actress in a Leading Role	Saving Mr. Banks	Nominated	
2022	Best Actress in a Leading Role	Good Luck to You, Leo Grande	Nominated	
British Academy Television Awards
1987	Best Actress	Fortunes of War / Tutti Frutti	Won	

=== Emmy Awards ===
Year	Category	Nominated work	Result	Ref.
Primetime Emmy Awards
1998	Outstanding Guest Actress in a Comedy Series	Ellen (episode: "Emma")	Won	
2001	Outstanding Writing for a Limited Series or Movie	Wit	Nominated	
2001	Outstanding Lead Actress in a Limited Series or Movie	Wit	Nominated	
2004	Outstanding Lead Actress in a Limited Series or Movie	Angels in America	Nominated	
2012	Outstanding Lead Actress in a Limited Series or Movie	The Song of Lunch	Nominated	
2015	Outstanding Lead Actress in a Limited Series or Movie	Sweeney Todd: Live from Lincoln Center	Nominated	
2019	Outstanding Guest Actress in a Comedy Series	Saturday Night Live ("Emma Thompson/Jonas Brothers")	Nominated	

=== Golden Globe Awards ===
Year	Category	Nominated work	Result	Ref.
1993	Best Actress in a Motion Picture – Drama	Howards End	Won	
1994	Best Actress in a Motion Picture – Drama	The Remains of the Day	Nominated	
1994	Best Supporting Actress – Motion Picture	In the Name of the Father	Nominated	
1995	Best Actress – Motion Picture Comedy or Musical	Junior	Nominated	
1996	Best Actress in a Motion Picture – Drama	Sense and Sensibility	Nominated	
1996	Best Screenplay – Motion Picture	Sense and Sensibility	Won	
2002	Best Actress – Miniseries or Television Film	Wit	Nominated	
2009	Best Actress – Motion Picture Comedy or Musical	Last Chance Harvey	Nominated	
2014	Best Actress in a Motion Picture – Drama	Saving Mr. Banks	Nominated	
2020	Best Actress – Motion Picture Comedy or Musical	Late Night	Nominated	
2023	Best Actress – Motion Picture Comedy or Musical	Good Luck to You, Leo Grande	Nominated	

=== Grammy Awards ===
Year	Category	Nominated work	Result	Ref.
1994	Best Spoken Word Album	Howards End	Nominated	
2011	Best Spoken Word Album for Children	Nanny McPhee Returns	Nominated	

=== Independent Spirit Awards ===
Year	Category	Nominated work	Result	Ref.
1991	Best Supporting Female	Impromptu	Nominated	
1993	Best Female Lead	Much Ado About Nothing	Nominated	

=== Screen Actors Guild Awards ===
Year	Category	Nominated work	Result	Ref.
1995	Outstanding Female Actor in a Leading Role	Sense and Sensibility	Nominated	
1995	Outstanding Cast in a Motion Picture	Sense and Sensibility	Nominated	
2001	Outstanding Female Actor in a Miniseries or Television Movie	Wit	Nominated	
2003	Outstanding Female Actor in a Miniseries or Television Movie	Angels in America	Nominated	
2009	Outstanding Cast in a Motion Picture	An Education	Nominated	
2013	Outstanding Female Actor in a Leading Role	Saving Mr. Banks	Nominated	

== Critics awards ==
Organizations	Year	Category	Work	Result	Ref.
AARP Movies for Grownups Awards	2023	Best Actress	Good Luck to You, Leo Grande	Nominated	
British Independent Film Awards	2022	Best Joint Lead Performance	Good Luck to You, Leo Grande	Nominated	
Broadcast Film Critics Association	1995	Best Actress	Sense and Sensibility / Carrington	Nominated	
Broadcast Film Critics Association	1995	Best Screenplay	Sense and Sensibility	Won	
Broadcast Film Critics Association	2001	Best Actress in a Picture Made for Television	Wit	Nominated	
Broadcast Film Critics Association	2006	Best Supporting Actress	Stranger than Fiction	Nominated	
Broadcast Film Critics Association	2013	Best Actress	Saving Mr. Banks	Nominated	
Broadcast Film Critics Association	2019	Best Supporting Actress in a Movie/Miniseries	Years and Years	Nominated	
Chicago Film Critics Association	1992	Best Actress	Howards End	Won	
Dallas–Fort Worth Film Critics Association	2013	Best Actress	Saving Mr. Banks	Nominated	
Denver Film Critics Society	2013	Best Actress	Saving Mr. Banks	Nominated	
Dublin Film Critics' Circle	2013	Best Actress	Saving Mr. Banks	Nominated	
Hollywood Critics Association	2022	Best Actress (Midseason Awards)	Good Luck to You, Leo Grande	Nominated	
Houston Film Critics Society	2013	Best Actress	Saving Mr. Banks	Nominated	
Kansas City Film Critics Circle	1992	Best Actress	Howards End	Won	
Kansas City Film Critics Circle	1993	Best Actress	The Remains of the Day	Won	
Kansas City Film Critics Circle	1993	Best Supporting Actress	In the Name of the Father	Won	
London Film Critics' Circle	1996	Best British Screenwriter	Sense and Sensibility	Won	
London Film Critics' Circle	2003	Best British Supporting Actress	Love Actually	Won	
London Film Critics' Circle	2006	Best British Supporting Actress	Stranger than Fiction	Nominated	
London Film Critics' Circle	2008	Best British Supporting Actress	Brideshead Revisited	Nominated	
London Film Critics' Circle	2013	Best British Actress of the Year	Beautiful Creatures, Saving Mr. Banks	Nominated	
Las Vegas Film Critics Society	2013	Best Actress	Saving Mr. Banks	Won	
Los Angeles Film Critics Association	1992	Best Actress	Howards End	Won	
Los Angeles Film Critics Association	1995	Best Screenplay	Sense and Sensibility	Won	
National Board of Review	1992	Best Actress	Howards End	Won	
National Board of Review	1995	Best Actress	Carrington / Sense and Sensibility	Won	
National Board of Review	2013	Best Actress	Saving Mr. Banks	Won	
National Society of Film Critics	1992	Best Actress	Howards End	Won	
New York Film Critics Circle	1992	Best Actress	Howards End	Won	
New York Film Critics Circle	1995	Best Screenplay	Sense and Sensibility	Won	
North Carolina Film Critics Association	2013	Best Actress	Saving Mr. Banks	Nominated	
Phoenix Film Critics Society	2013	Best Actress	Saving Mr. Banks	Nominated	
Phoenix Film Critics Society	2013	Best Cast	Saving Mr. Banks	Nominated	
San Diego Film Critics Society	2013	Best Actress	Saving Mr. Banks	Nominated	
Southeastern Film Critics Association	1992	Best Actress	Howards End	Won	
St. Louis Film Critics Association	2013	Best Actress	Saving Mr. Banks	Nominated	
WDCAFC Awards	2013	Best Actress	Saving Mr. Banks	Nominated	

== Miscellaneous awards ==
Organizations	Year	Category	Work	Result	Ref.
Alliance of Women Film Journalists Award	2013	Best Actress	Saving Mr. Banks	Nominated	
Alliance of Women Film Journalists Award	2022	Best Actress	Good Luck to You, Leo Grande	Nominated	
Alliance of Women Film Journalists Award	2022	Best Daring Performance	Good Luck to You, Leo Grande	Won	
Annie Award	2002	Voice Acting in a Feature	Treasure Planet	Nominated	
Awards Circuit Community Award	2013	Best Actress	Saving Mr. Banks	Nominated	
Boston Society of Film Critics	1992	Best Actress	Howards End	Won	
Boston Society of Film Critics	1995	Best Screenplay	Sense and Sensibility	Won	
Capri Hollywood International Film Festival	2022	Best European Actress	Good Luck to You, Leo Grande	Won	
Empire Awards	2013	Best Actress	Saving Mr. Banks	Won	
European Film Awards	1997	Best Actress	The Winter Guest	Nominated	
Gold Derby Award	2013	Best Actress	Saving Mr. Banks	Nominated	
IGN Award	2013	Best Movie Actress	Saving Mr. Banks	Nominated	
National Board of Review	1992	Best Actress	Howards End	Won	
National Board of Review	1995	Best Actress	Sense and Sensibility	Won	
National Board of Review	2013	Best Actress	Saving Mr. Banks	Won	
Satellite Awards	2001	Best Actress – Miniseries or Television Film	Wit	Nominated	
Satellite Awards	2003	Best Supporting Actress – Miniseries or Television Film	Angels in America	Nominated	
Satellite Awards	2003	Best Supporting Actress	Love Actually	Nominated	
Satellite Awards	2008	Best Supporting Actress	Brideshead Revisited	Nominated	
Satellite Awards	2013	Best Actress	Saving Mr. Banks	Nominated	
Saturn Awards	2006	Best Supporting Actress	Stranger than Fiction	Nominated	
Saturn Awards	2013	Best Actress	Saving Mr. Banks	Nominated	
Venice International Film Festival	1997	Best Actress	The Winter Guest	Won	
Writers Guild of America Awards	1995	Best Adapted Screenplay	Sense and Sensibility	Won	
Attenborough UK Film Award	2013	Best On Screen Duo	Saving Mr. Banks	Won	
Kermode Award	2014	Best Actress	Saving Mr. Banks	Won	
78th Locarno Film Festival	2025	Leopard Club Award	Her work in the film industry has left its mark on the collective imagination.	Honored	

== See also ==
- List of British actors
- List of Academy Award winners and nominees from Great Britain
- List of Academy Award records
- List of actors with Academy Award nominations
- List of actors with more than one Academy Award nomination in the acting categories
- List of Primetime Emmy Award winners
- List of Golden Globe winners
