= Cherie Jimenez =

American actress (born 1987)

Cheri Alexandra Daly
- Born: June 23, 1987 (age 38); New York City, New York
- Occupation: Actress
- Years active: 2001–present

Cherie Alexandra Daly (born June 23, 1987) known professionally as Cherie Jimenez is an American actress. She is best known for playing Gabi Hernandez in the soap opera Days of Our Lives.

== Early life ==
Jimenez was born in New York City on June 23, 1987 to David and Sandy Daly. She has a younger brother named Dylan. She is a graduate of the State University of New York at Purchase. She is of Italian, Puerto Rican, Dominican, Spanish and Taino Native American ancestry.

== Career ==
Jimenez made her acting debut in the romantic comedy film Jump Tomorrow. She made appearances in numerous shows such as Pretty Little Liars,NCIS, and The Newsroom. Her first recurring came playing Jill Francis in the crime thriller series 'Banshee Her biggest role so far has been playing Gabi Hernandez in the soap opera Days of Our Lives. She took over the role from Camila Banus. After getting the role she suffered bullying by some of the shows fanbase due to Banus being a fan favourite.

== Personal life ==
Jimenez married actor Sean Faris at the Burning Man on August 31, 2017. In March 2022 they welcomed a son named Phoenix.

== Filmography ==
=== Film ===
Year	Title	Role	Notes
2001	Jump Tomorrow	Maria	
2013	Blood Shed	Jezebel	
2017	Una Razon Porque	Woman	Short
2019	Vlog	Jordan	Short
2020	Natural Management	Maggie	Short
2020	Lost Girls: Angie's Story	Rachel	
2020	Bad Suns	Sergent Williams	Short
2023	Maya	Rachel Martinez	
2024	Breaking Tradition	Mr Sharrifs Wife	
2024	Guns & Moses	Paulina Rosner	

=== Television ===
Year	Title	Role	Notes
2013	The Coasters	Kristen	Episode; Bra-Mance
2013	Pretty Little Liars	Marissa	Episode; Gamma Zeta Die!
2013	The Newsroom	Chelsea	Episode; One Step Too Many
2015-2016	Banshee	Jill Francis	3 episodes
2019	NCIS	Senator Ortega	Episode; Into the Light
2021	Nova Vita	Anna	10 episodes
2024-2025	Days of Our Lives	Gabi Hernandez	122 episodes
