= Fiona Chalmers =

British actress

Fiona Chalmers is a British actress who appeared in TV series in the late 1980s and early 1990s. She is best known for roles in the series Take the High Road (1986) and Tutti Frutti (1987).
