= Joel Hopkins =

British independent film director and screenwriter

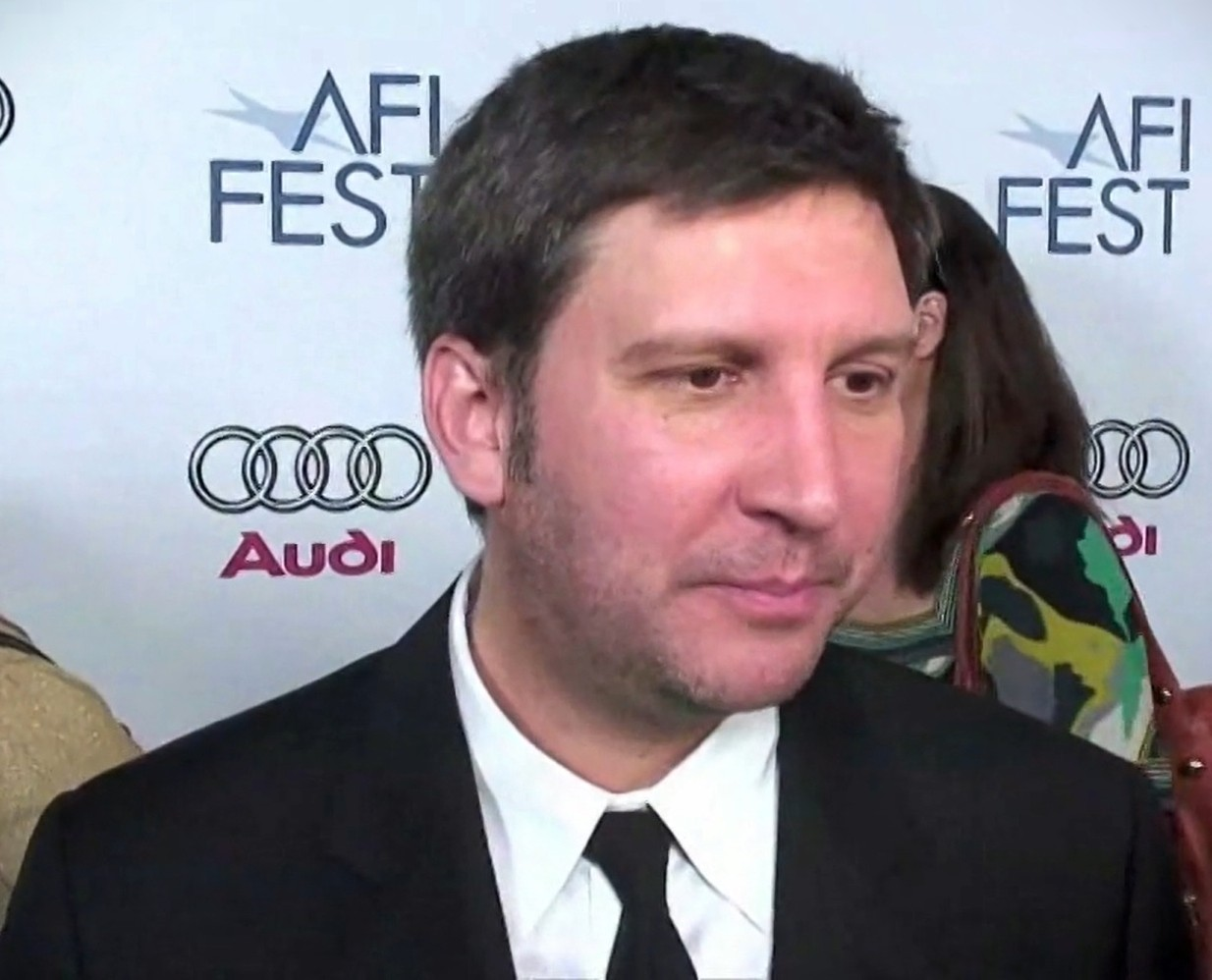
- Hopkins in 2008
- Born: 6 September 1970 (age 56); London, England
- Occupations: Film director, screenwriter
- Years active: 2001–present
- Partner: Nicola Usborne

Joel Hopkins (born 6 September 1970) is a British independent film director and screenwriter best known for his films Jump Tomorrow (2001) and Last Chance Harvey (2008).

== Career ==
Hopkins was born in London, England, he moved to New York City to attend university. His first feature film, 2001's Jump Tomorrow, was based on his 1998 short film "Jorge", which he filmed in New York while attending New York University's (NYU) Tisch School of the Arts. For "Jorge", Hopkins won NYU's Wasserman Award—a US$100,000 grant towards filming another project—which went towards the production budget for Jump Tomorrow. The film received positive reviews from critics, but was only granted a limited release and never reached a wider audience. Hopkins was nominated for two British Independent Film Awards for his work on the film: The Douglas Hickox Award for debuting filmmakers and the Best Screenplay Award. He won 2002's British Academy of Film and Television Arts (BAFTA) Carl Foreman Award for the Most Promising Newcomer, as well as a number of other awards at film festivals where the film was screened.

After writing and directing Jump Tomorrow, Hopkins said, "I'd been attached to films that haven't happened, as a director. I've had scripts I've written that have almost happened." When Hopkins was being considered to direct the 2005 children's film Nanny McPhee, for which he was ultimately unsuccessful, he met with Emma Thompson, who had written the script and would star as the title character. After seeing her in a Broadway production opposite Dustin Hoffman, Hopkins decided to write a script to emulate the interpersonal chemistry which he had seen between the two actors. He has said that the story was inspired by one of his parents' friends who was ageing but still "finding his feet". Overall, Last Chance Harvey was received favourably by critics.

His film The Love Punch was selected to be screened in the Gala Presentation section at the 2013 Toronto International Film Festival.

== Personal life ==
Hopkins' wife is Nicola Usborne, who is also his producing partner and has produced both Jump Tomorrow and Last Chance Harvey.

Hopkins is the son of Michael and Patricia Hopkins of the prominent British architectural firm Hopkins Architects.
