= Jump Tomorrow =

2001 film by Joel Hopkins

- DVD cover
- Directed by: Joel Hopkins
- Screenplay by: Joel Hopkins
- Based on: Jorge by Joel Hopkins
- Produced by: Nicola Usborne
- Starring: Tunde Adebimpe; Hippolyte Girardot; Natalia Verbeke
- Cinematography: Patrick Cady
- Edited by: Susan Littenberg
- Music by: John Kimbrough
- Production company: FilmFour Productions
- Distributed by: IFC Films (United States); FilmFour Distributors (United Kingdom)
- Release dates: 19 January 2001 (Sundance); 13 July 2001 (United States); 9 November 2001 (United Kingdom)
- Running time: 97 minutes
- Countries: United Kingdom; United States
- Languages: English; French; Spanish
- Box office: $33,236

Jump Tomorrow is a 2001 British independent romantic comedy film written and directed by Joel Hopkins, starring Tunde Adebimpe, Hippolyte Girardot, and Natalia Verbeke. It concerns George (Adebimpe), a shy, bespectacled man who is about to marry a fellow Nigerian American woman named Sophie Ochenado, played by Abiola Abrams, when he falls for a Spanish woman. It is based on a short film called Jorge.

== Plot ==
Three days before his wedding, George meets two intriguing people: Alicia (Verbeke), a Spanish woman who invites him to a party that night, and Gerard (Girardot), an unlucky-in-love Frenchman who has just been turned down for a marriage proposal. To cheer him up, George takes him to Alicia's party. There, George finds himself attracted to Alicia, but she is already dating a British professor, Nathan. A drunk Gerard goes to the roof and attempts suicide, but George talks him out of it by telling him to "jump tomorrow."

Out of gratitude, Gerard offers to drive George to his wedding. On the road, George buys an audiocassette to learn Spanish and secretly fantasizes about Alicia. The movie spoofs Spanish soap operas in fantasy sequences where George imagines himself and Alicia as characters on the show. The compassionate Gerard figures out that George is not in love with his fiancée, a childhood friend whom his family has always expected him to marry. George is a passive individual who does not seem troubled by the idea of marrying someone he does not love.

George spots Alicia and her boyfriend at a gas station, and Gerard talks George into following them. They all end up at a hotel with a love motif and a variety of strange furniture, including a bathtub in the form of a giant champagne glass. Gerard advises George to gain Alicia's attention by making her jealous. A reluctant George ends up inviting to his room a saleswoman who calls herself "Heather Leather." But he doesn't know that she's allergic to cologne, and disaster ensues. He never crosses paths with Alicia, whose boyfriend gives her an engagement ring made of bone. The next day, George wants to resume his journey alone. But Gerard gives a heartfelt speech about love, and he convinces George to stick with him.

Alicia and her fiancé hitch a ride with George and Gerard, thinking their sudden appearance a coincidence. Alicia's fiancé Nathan practices tai chi in the rain and argues with Gerard about whether the French language is obsolete. Meanwhile, Alicia and George find themselves falling for each other. When they arrive at the home of Alicia's family, who are meeting Alicia's fiancé for the first time, George wants to leave. But Gerard convinces him to stick around for the night, telling him to "jump tomorrow."

Alicia's fiancé ends up in bed the whole time after Alicia's uncle, a deaf-mute, offers him a spicy dish his stomach can't handle. The uncle takes a liking to George and teaches him a Spanish dance. Gerard finds himself attracted to Alicia's mother, a widow. They all enjoy the party that night, and George gets a chance to make his move, but he is too shy to proceed. Gerard spends the night with Alicia's mother, but in the morning she rebuffs him for moving too fast with their relationship.

Gerard and George leave for the wedding. After dropping off George, Gerard heads towards Niagara Falls, where he again considers suicide until a boy standing there tells him that he gets his best ideas when he is by himself. At the ceremony, George declares "I am Jorge" (the Spanish form of George) and calls the wedding off. He and his fiancée Sophie agree that their intended marriage was for convenience and not an ideal match. Gerard and George catch up to Alicia and her fiancé at the border of Canada, and George finally expresses his love for her.

== Reception ==
David Rooney of Variety called it "a promising debut from a filmmaker with a strongly developed visual sense and a solid grasp of character-driven comedy".
