= Emma Thompson =

English actress and screenwriter (born 1959)

Dame Emma Thompson DBE
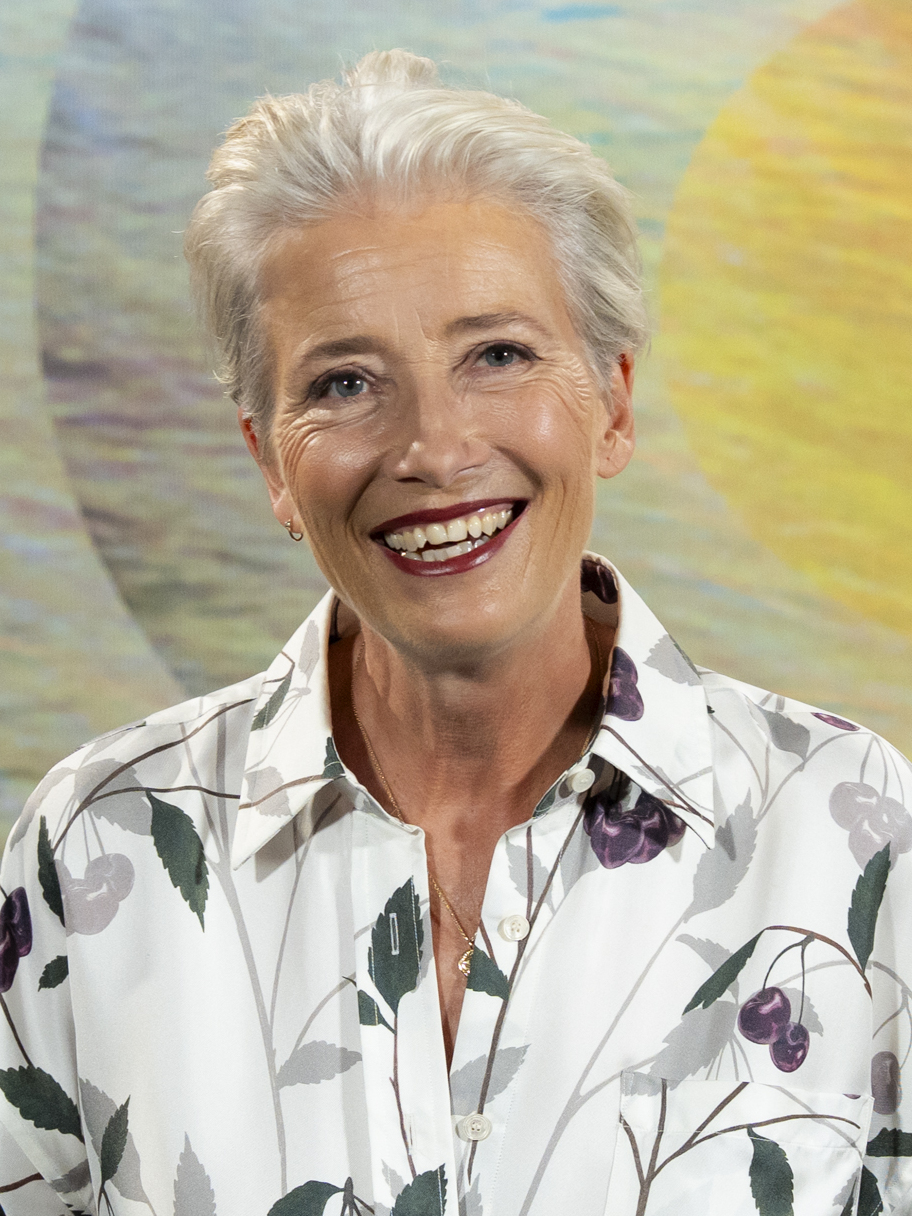
- Thompson in 2025
- Born: 15 April 1959 (age 67); Hammersmith, London, England
- Education: Newnham College, Cambridge (BA)
- Occupations: Actress; screenwriter
- Years active: 1982–present
- Works: Full list
- Spouses: Kenneth Branagh (m. 1989; div. 1997); Greg Wise (m. 2003)
- Children: 2
- Parents: Eric Thompson (father); Phyllida Law (mother)
- Relatives: Sophie Thompson (sister)
- Awards: Full list
- Emma Thompson's voice from the BBC programme The Film Programme, 28 November 2013.

Dame Emma Thompson (born 15 April 1959) is an English actress and screenwriter. Her work spans over four decades of screen and stage, and her accolades include two Academy Awards, three BAFTA Awards, two Golden Globe Awards, and a Primetime Emmy Award as well as a nomination for two Grammy Awards. In 2018, she was made a dame by Queen Elizabeth II for her contributions to drama.

Born to actors Eric Thompson and Phyllida Law, Thompson was educated at Newnham College, Cambridge, where she became a member of the Footlights troupe, and appeared in the comedy sketch series Alfresco (1983–1984). In 1985, she starred in the West End revival of the musical Me and My Girl, which was a breakthrough in her career. In 1987, she came to prominence for her performances in two BBC series, Tutti Frutti and Fortunes of War, winning the BAFTA TV Award for Best Actress for her work on both series. In the early 1990s, she often collaborated with then-husband, actor and director Kenneth Branagh, in films such as Henry V (1989), Dead Again (1991), and Much Ado About Nothing (1993).

For her performance in the Merchant-Ivory period drama Howards End (1992), Thompson won the BAFTA Award and the Academy Award for Best Actress. In 1993, she received two Academy Award nominations—Best Actress and Best Supporting Actress—for the respective roles of the housekeeper of a grand household in The Remains of the Day and a lawyer in In the Name of the Father, becoming one of the few actors to achieve this feat. Thompson wrote and starred in Sense and Sensibility (1995), for which she won the Academy Award for Best Adapted Screenplay—making her the only person in history to win Oscars for both acting and writing—and once again won the BAFTA. Further critical acclaim came for her roles in Primary Colors (1998), Love Actually (2003), Saving Mr. Banks (2013), Late Night (2019), and Good Luck to You, Leo Grande (2022).

Other notable film credits include the Harry Potter saga (2004–2011), Nanny McPhee (2005) (which she also wrote), Stranger than Fiction (2006), An Education (2009), Men in Black 3 (2012) and the spin-off Men in Black: International (2019), Brave (2012), Beauty and the Beast (2017), Cruella (2021), and Matilda the Musical (2022). Her television credits include Wit (2001), Angels in America (2003), The Song of Lunch (2010), King Lear (2018) and Years and Years (2019). She portrayed Mrs. Lovett in a Lincoln Center production of Stephen Sondheim's Sweeney Todd: The Demon Barber of Fleet Street in 2014. Authorised by the publishers of Beatrix Potter, Thompson has also written three Peter Rabbit children's books.

== Early life and education ==
Emma Thompson was born on 15 April 1959 in Hammersmith, London. Her mother was Scottish actress Phyllida Law, while her English father, Eric Thompson, was an actor best known as the writer of the popular children's television series The Magic Roundabout. Her godfather was the director and writer Ronald Eyre. She has a younger sister, Sophie, who is also an actress. The family lived in the West Hampstead district of London, and Thompson was educated at Camden School for Girls. She spent much time in Scotland during her childhood and often visited Ardentinny, where her grandparents and uncle lived.

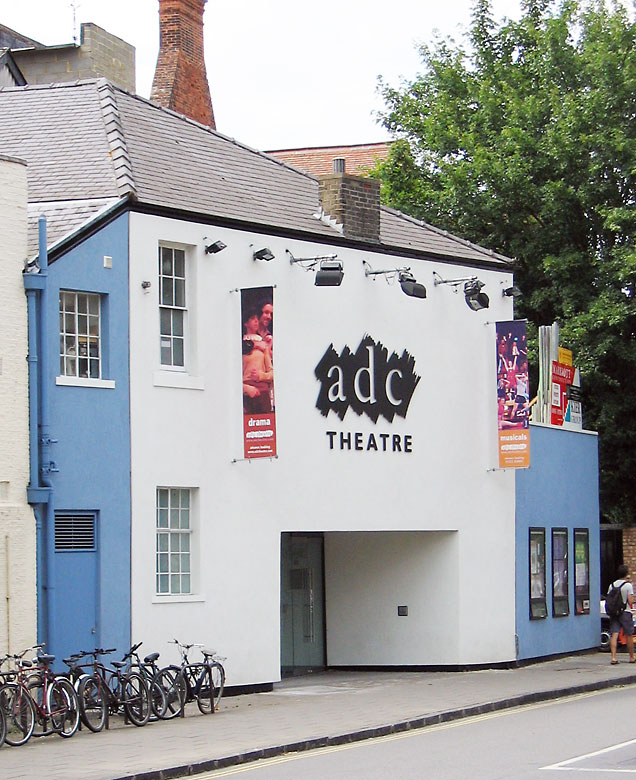
ADC Theatre, University of Cambridge, where Thompson began performing with Footlights

In her youth, Thompson was intrigued by language and literature, a trait she attributes to her father, who shared her love of words. After successfully taking A levels in English, French and Latin, and securing a scholarship, she began studying for an English degree at Newnham College, Cambridge, arriving in 1977. Thompson believes that it was inevitable she would become an actor, remarking that she was "surrounded by creative people and I don't think it would ever have gone any other way, really". While there, she had a "seminal moment" that turned her to feminism and inspired her to take up performing. She explained in a 2007 interview how she discovered the book The Madwoman in the Attic, "which is about Victorian female writers and the disguises they took on in order to express what they wanted to express. That completely changed my life." She became a self-professed "punk rocker", with short red hair and a motorbike, and aspired to be a comedian like Lily Tomlin.

At Cambridge, Thompson was invited into the Cambridge Footlights, the university's prestigious sketch comedy troupe, by its president, Martin Bergman. (Note: One source says that she was its first female member, but another source identifies Germaine Greer as the first female full member much earlier, in the 1960s.) Also in the troupe were fellow actors Stephen Fry and Hugh Laurie, and she had a romantic relationship with the latter. Fry recalled that "there was no doubt that Emma was going the distance. Our nickname for her was Emma Talented." In 1980, Thompson served as the Vice President of Footlights, and co-directed the troupe's first all-female revue, Woman's Hour. The following year, she and her Footlights team won the Perrier Award at the Edinburgh Festival Fringe for their sketch show The Cellar Tapes. She graduated with upper second-class honours. In the early 80s, Thompson studied clowning under Philippe Gaulier at École Philippe Gaulier.

Thompson's father died in 1982, at age 52. She has stated that this "tore [the family] to pieces", and "I can't begin to tell you how much I regret his not being around". She added, "At the same time, it's possible that were he still alive I might never have had the space or courage to do what I've done... I have a definite feeling of inheriting space. And power."

== Career ==
=== Early work and breakthrough (1980–1989) ===
During Thompson's years studying at Cambridge, she starred in a BBC Radio 4 comedy series called Injury Time, which was recorded and broadcast from 1980 to 1982.

Thompson had her first professional role in 1982, touring in a stage version of Not the Nine O'Clock News. She then turned to television, where much of her early work came with her Footlights co-stars Hugh Laurie and Stephen Fry. The regional ITV comedy series There's Nothing to Worry About! (1982) was their first outing, followed by the one-off BBC show The Crystal Cube (1983). There's Nothing to Worry About! later returned as the networked sketch show Alfresco (1983–84), which ran for two series with Thompson, Fry, Laurie, Ben Elton, and Robbie Coltrane. She later collaborated again with Fry and Laurie on the acclaimed BBC Radio 4 series Saturday Night Fry (1988).

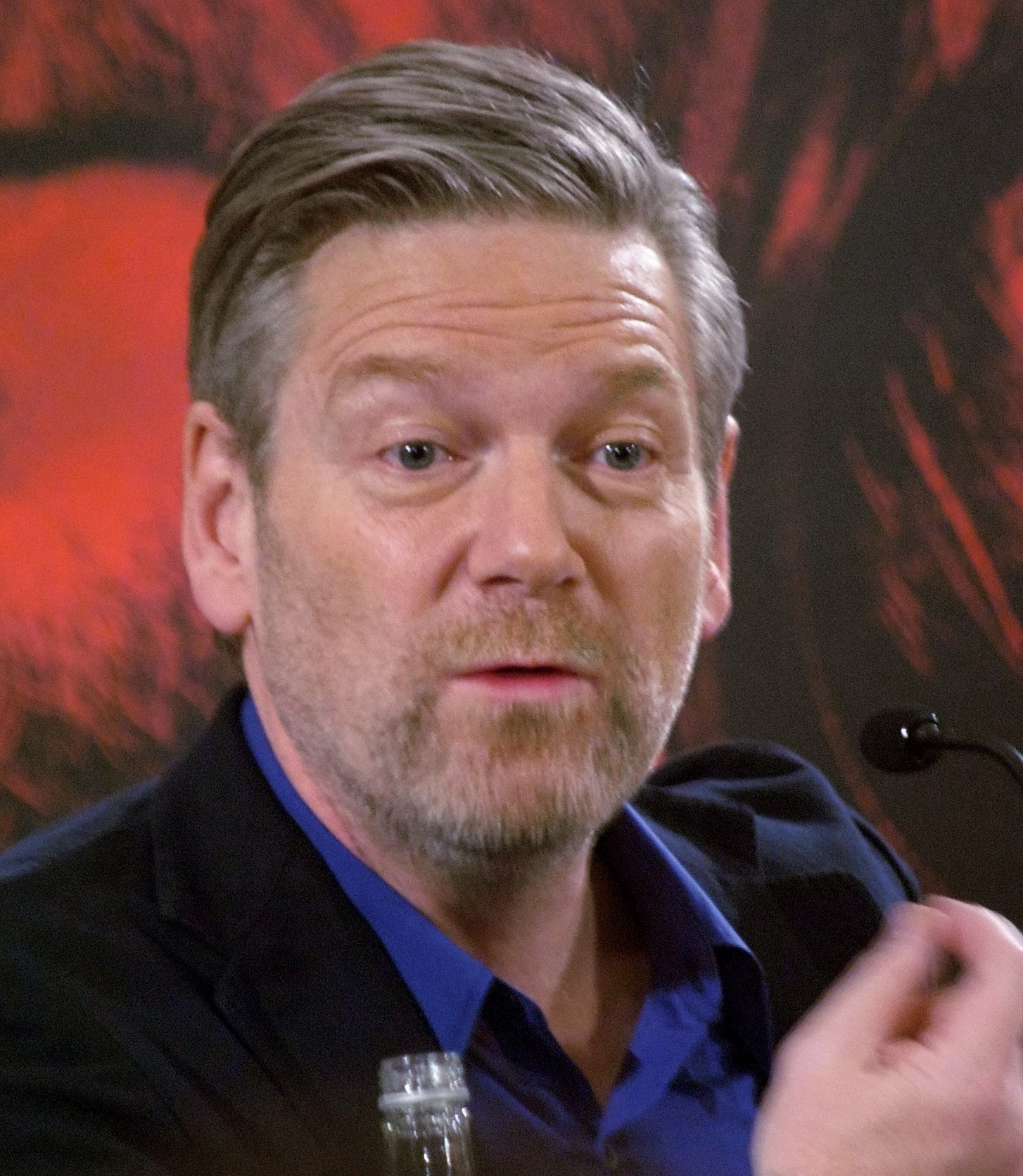
Thompson's first husband Kenneth Branagh (pictured in 2011) collaborated with her early in her career.

In 1985, Thompson was cast in the West End revival of the musical Me and My Girl, co-starring Robert Lindsay. It provided a breakthrough in her career, as the production earned rave reviews. She played the role of Sally Smith for 15 months, which exhausted her; she later remarked "I thought if I did the fucking 'Lambeth Walk' one more time I was going to fucking throw up." At the end of 1985, she wrote and starred in her own one-off special for Channel 4, Emma Thompson: Up for Grabs.

Thompson achieved another breakthrough in 1987, when she had leading roles in two television miniseries: Fortunes of War, a World War II drama costarring Kenneth Branagh, and Tutti Frutti, a dark comedy about a Scottish rock band with Robbie Coltrane. For these performances, Thompson won the British Academy Television Award for Best Actress. The following year, she wrote and starred in her own sketch comedy series for BBC, Thompson, but this was poorly received. In 1989, she and Branagh—with whom she had formed a romantic relationship—starred in a stage revival of Look Back in Anger, directed by Judi Dench and produced by Branagh's Renaissance Theatre Company. Later that year, the pair starred in a televised version of the play.

Thompson's first cinema appearance came in the romantic comedy The Tall Guy (1989), the feature-film debut from screenwriter Richard Curtis. It starred Jeff Goldblum as a West End actor, and Thompson played the nurse with whom he falls in love. The film was not widely seen, but Thompson's performance was praised in The New York Times, where Caryn James called her "an exceptionally versatile comic actress". She next turned to Shakespeare, appearing as Princess Katherine in Branagh's screen adaptation of Henry V (1989). The film was released to great critical acclaim.

=== Howards End and worldwide recognition (1990–1993) ===
Thompson and Branagh are considered by American writer and critic James Monaco to have led the "British cinematic onslaught" in the 1990s. She continued to experiment with Shakespeare in the new decade, appearing with Branagh in his stage productions of A Midsummer Night's Dream and King Lear. Reviewing the latter, the Chicago Tribune praised her "extraordinary" performance of the "hobbling, stooped hunchback Fool". Thompson returned to cinema in 1991, playing a "frivolous aristocrat" in Impromptu with Judy Davis and Hugh Grant. She was nominated for Best Supporting Female at the Independent Spirit Awards. Her second release of 1991 was another pairing with Branagh, who also directed, in the Los Angeles-based noir Dead Again. She played a woman who has forgotten her identity. Early in 1992, Thompson had a guest role in an episode of Cheers as Frasier Crane's first wife.

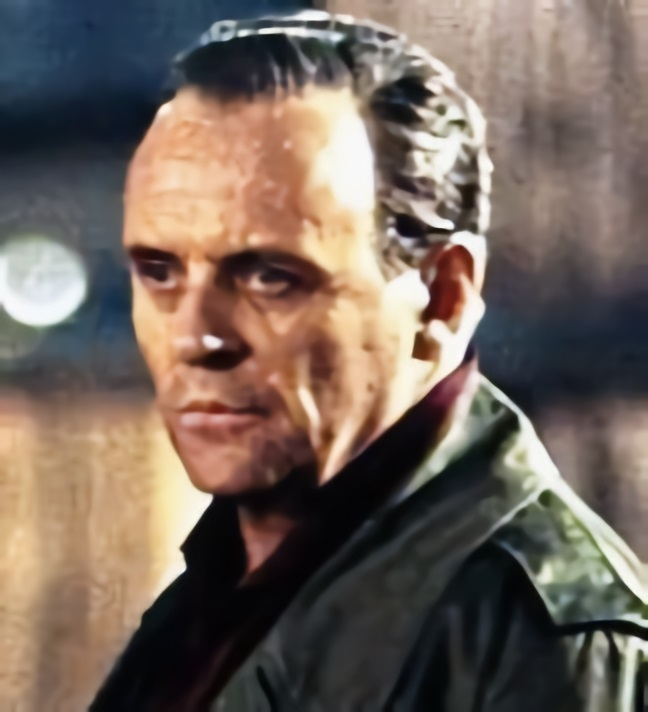
Anthony Hopkins (pictured in 1992) starred with Thompson in Howards End (1992) and The Remains of the Day (1993)

A turning point in Thompson's career came when she was cast opposite Anthony Hopkins and Vanessa Redgrave in the Merchant Ivory period drama Howards End (1992), based on the novel by E. M. Forster. The film explored the social class system in Edwardian Britain, with Thompson playing an idealistic, intellectual, forward-looking woman who comes into association with a privileged and deeply conservative family. She actively pursued the role by writing to director James Ivory, who agreed to an audition and then gave her the part. According to the critic Vincent Canby, the film allowed Thompson to "[come] into her own", away from Branagh. Upon release, Roger Ebert wrote that she was "superb in the central role: quiet, ironic, observant, with steel inside". Howards End was widely praised, a "surprise hit", and received nine Academy Award nominations. Among its three wins was the Best Actress trophy for Thompson, who was also awarded a Golden Globe and BAFTA for her performance. Reflecting on the role, The New York Times wrote that the actress "found herself an international success almost overnight".

For her next two films, Thompson returned to working with Branagh. In Peter's Friends (1992), the pair starred with Stephen Fry, Hugh Laurie, Imelda Staunton, and Tony Slattery as a group of Cambridge alumni who are reunited ten years after graduating. The comedy was positively reviewed, and Desson Howe of The Washington Post wrote that Thompson was its highlight: "Even as a rather one-dimensional character, she exudes grace and an adroit sense of comic tragedy." She followed this with Branagh's screen version of Much Ado About Nothing (1993). The couple starred as Beatrice and Benedick, alongside a cast that also included Denzel Washington, Keanu Reeves, and Michael Keaton. Thompson was widely praised for the on-screen chemistry with Branagh and the natural ease with which she played the role, marking another critical success for Thompson. Her performance earned a nomination for Best Female Lead at the Independent Spirit Awards.

Thompson reunited with Merchant–Ivory and Anthony Hopkins to film The Remains of the Day (1993), which has been described as a "classic" and the production team's definitive film. Based on Kazuo Ishiguro's novel about a housekeeper and butler in interwar Britain, the story is acclaimed for its study of loneliness and repression, though Thompson was particularly interested in looking at "the deformity that servitude inflicts upon people", since her grandmother had worked as a servant and made many sacrifices. She has named the film as one of the greatest experiences of her career, considering it to be a "masterpiece of withheld emotion". The Remains of the Day was a critical and commercial success, receiving eight Oscar nominations, including Best Picture and a second Best Actress nomination for Thompson.

Along with her Best Actress nomination at the 66th Academy Awards, Thompson was also nominated in the Best Supporting Actress category, making her the eighth performer in history to be nominated for two Oscars in the same year. It came for her role as the lawyer Gareth Peirce in In the Name of the Father (1993), a drama about the Guildford Four starring Daniel Day-Lewis. The film was her second hit of the year, earning $65 million and critical praise, and was nominated for Best Picture along with The Remains of the Day.

=== Sense and Sensibility and established actress (1994–1999) ===
In 1994, Thompson made her Hollywood debut playing a goofy doctor alongside Arnold Schwarzenegger and Danny DeVito in Junior. Although the male pregnancy storyline was poorly received by most critics and flopped at the box office, Mick LaSalle of the San Francisco Chronicle praised the lead trio. She returned to independent cinema for a lead role in Carrington, which studied the platonic relationship between artist Dora Carrington and writer Lytton Strachey (played by Jonathan Pryce). Roger Ebert remarked that Thompson had "developed a specialty in unrequited love", and the TV Guide Film & Video Companion commented that her "neurasthenic mannerisms, which usually drive us batty, are appropriate here".

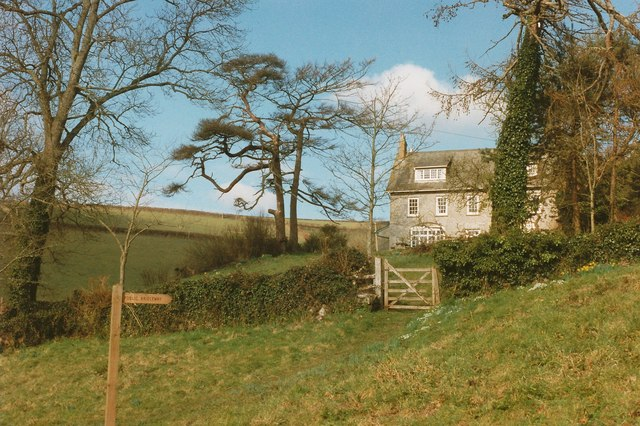
Efford House in Holbeton which stood in for Barton Cottage in Sense and Sensibility (1995)

Thompson's Academy success continued with Sense and Sensibility (1995), generally considered to be the most popular and authentic of the numerous film adaptations of Jane Austen's novels made in the 1990s. Thompson—a lifelong lover of Austen's work—was hired to write the film based on the period sketches in her series Thompson. She spent five years developing the screenplay, and took the role of the sister Elinor Dashwood despite, aged 35, being 16 years older than the literary character. Directed by Ang Lee and co-starring Kate Winslet, Sense and Sensibility received widespread critical acclaim and ranks among the highest-grossing films of Thompson's career. Shelly Frome remarked that she displayed a "great affinity for Jane Austen's style and wit", and Graham Fuller of Sight and Sound saw her as the film's auteur. Thompson received a third nomination for Best Actress and won the award for Best Adapted Screenplay, making her the only person in history to win an Oscar for both acting and screenwriting. She also earned a second BAFTA Award for Best Actress and a Golden Globe Award for Best Screenplay.

Thompson was absent from screens in 1996, but returned the following year with Alan Rickman's directorial debut, The Winter Guest. Set over one day in a Scottish seaside village, the drama allowed Thompson and her mother (Phyllida Law) to play mother and daughter on screen. She then returned to America to appear in an episode of Ellen, and her self-parodying performance received a Primetime Emmy Award for Outstanding Guest Actress in a Comedy Series.

For her second Hollywood role, Thompson starred with John Travolta in Mike Nichols's Primary Colors (1998), playing a couple based on Bill and Hillary Clinton. Thompson's character, Susan, is described as that of an "ambitious, long-suffering wife" who has to deal with her husband's infidelity. The film was critically well received but lost money at the box office. According to Kevin O'Sullivan of the Daily Mirror, Americans were "blown away" by her performance and accent, and top Hollywood producers became increasingly interested in casting her. Thompson rejected many of the offers, expressing concerns about living in Los Angeles behind walls with bodyguards, and stated "LA is lovely as long as you know you can leave". She also admitted to feeling tired and jaded with the industry at this point, which influenced her decision to leave film for a year. Thompson followed Primary Colors by playing an FBI agent opposite Rickman in the poorly received thriller Judas Kiss (1998).

=== Continued screen work and further acclaim (2000–2011) ===
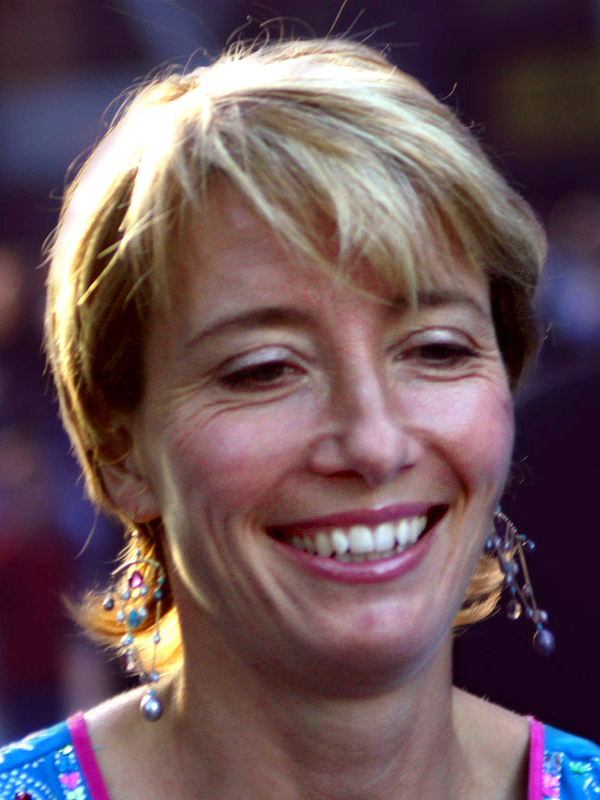
Thompson at the premiere of Nanny McPhee in 2005

When she became a mother in 1999, Thompson made a conscious decision to reduce her workload, and in the following years many of her appearances were in supporting roles. She was not seen on screen again until 2000, with a small part in the British comedy Maybe Baby, which she appeared in as a favour to its director, her friend Ben Elton.

For the HBO television film Wit (2001), however, Thompson took the lead role in what she felt was "one of the best scripts to have come out of America". Adapted from Margaret Edson's Pulitzer Prize winning play, it focuses on a self-sufficient Harvard University professor who finds her values challenged when she is diagnosed with ovarian cancer. Thompson was instrumental in bringing in Mike Nichols to direct the project, and the pair spent months in rehearsal to get the complex character right. She was drawn to the "daredevil" role, for which she had no qualms about shaving her head. Reviewing the performance, Roger Ebert was touched by "the way she struggles with every ounce of her humanity to keep her self-respect", and in 2008 he called it Thompson's finest work. Caryn James of The New York Times also described it as "one of her most brilliant performances", adding "we seem to be peering into a soul as embattled as its body." The film earned Thompson nominations at the Golden Globes, Emmys and Screen Actors Guild Awards.

Thompson's only credit of 2002 was a voice role in Disney's Treasure Planet, an adaptation of Treasure Island, where she voiced Captain Amelia. The animation earned far less than its large budget and was considered a "box office disaster". This failure was countered the following year by one of Thompson's biggest commercial successes, Richard Curtis's romantic comedy Love Actually. As part of an ensemble cast that included Liam Neeson, Keira Knightley, and Colin Firth, she played a middle-class wife who discovers her husband (played by Alan Rickman) has been unfaithful to her. The scene in which her stalwart character breaks down was described by one critic as "the best crying on screen ever", and in 2013, Thompson mentioned that she gets commended for this role more than any other. She explained, "I've had so much bloody practice at crying in a bedroom then having to go out and be cheerful, gathering up the pieces of my heart and putting them in a drawer." Her performance received a BAFTA nomination for Best Supporting Actress.

Thompson continued with supporting roles in the 2003 drama Imagining Argentina, where she played a dissident-journalist abducted by the country's 1970s dictatorial regime. Antonio Banderas played the husband who tries to find her, in a film that most critics disliked. The film was booed and jeered at when it was screened at the Venice Film Festival and received a scathing article in The Guardian. Thompson had greater success that year when she worked with HBO for a second time in the acclaimed miniseries Angels in America (2003). The show, also starring Al Pacino and Meryl Streep, deals with the AIDS epidemic in Reagan-era America. Thompson played three roles – a nurse, a homeless woman, and the title role of The Angel of America – and was again nominated for an Emmy Award. In 2004, she played the eccentric Divination teacher Sybill Trelawney in the third Harry Potter film, Prisoner of Azkaban, her character described as a "hippy chick professor who teaches fortune-telling". She later reprised the role in Order of the Phoenix (2007) and Deathly Hallows – Part 2 (2011), and has described her time working on the popular franchise as "great fun".

"Nanny McPhee, it took nine years to make that movie, from the moment I picked up the book to the moment we walked into the movie theatre ... the [films] were labours of great love and commitment."

— Thompson on Nanny McPhee and its sequel, which she wrote and starred in.

The year 2005 saw the release of a project Thompson had been working on for nine years. Loosely based on the Nurse Matilda stories that she read as a child, Thompson wrote the screenplay for the children's film Nanny McPhee – which centres on a mysterious, unsightly nanny who must discipline a group of children. She also took the lead role, alongside Colin Firth and Angela Lansbury, in what was a highly personal project. The film was a success, taking number one at the UK box office and earning $122 million worldwide. Commenting on Thompson's screenplay, film critic Claudia Puig wrote that its "well-worn storybook features are woven effectively into an appealing tale of youthful empowerment".

The following year, Thompson appeared in the surreal American comedy–drama Stranger than Fiction, playing a novelist whose latest character (played by Will Ferrell) is a real person who hears her narration in his head. Reviews for the film were generally favourable. Following a brief, uncredited role in the post-apocalyptic blockbuster I Am Legend (2007), Thompson played the devoutly Catholic Lady Marchmain in a 2008 film adaptation of Brideshead Revisited. Critics were unenthusiastic about the film, but several picked Thompson out as its highlight. Mark Kermode said "Emma Thompson is to some extent becoming the new Judi Dench, as the person who kind of comes in for 15 minutes and is brilliant ... [but then] when she goes away, the rest of the movie has a real problem living up to the wattage of her presence".

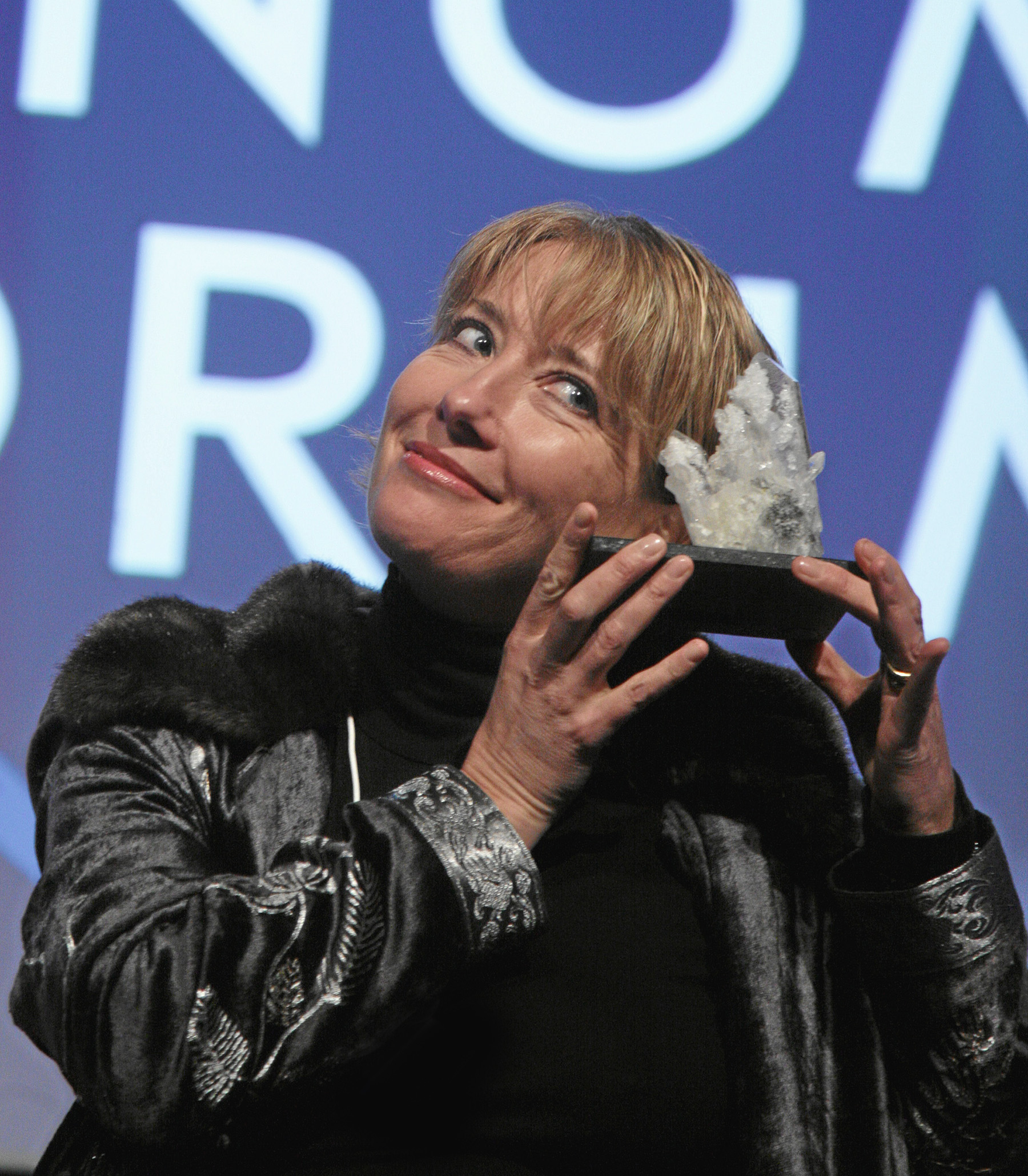
Thompson receiving the Crystal Award at the World Economic Forum in 2008

Thompson received further acclaim for her work in the London-based romance Last Chance Harvey (2008), where she and Dustin Hoffman played a lonely, middle-aged pair who cautiously begin a relationship. Critics praised the chemistry between the two leads, and both received Golden Globe nominations for their performances. Thompson's two 2009 films were both set in 1960s United Kingdom, and in both she made cameo appearances: as a headmistress in the critically praised drama An Education and as a "tippling mother" in Richard Curtis's The Boat That Rocked.

Five years after the original, Thompson reprised the role of Nanny McPhee with 2010's Nanny McPhee and the Big Bang. Her screenplay transported the story to Britain during World War II. Building on the first film's success, it was another UK box office number one and the sequel was widely seen as an improvement. The same year, Thompson reunited with Alan Rickman for the BBC television film The Song of Lunch, which focused on two unnamed characters meeting at a restaurant 15 years after ending their relationship. Thompson's performance earned her a fourth Emmy Award nomination.

=== Career expansion and blockbuster films (2012–present) ===
In 2012, Thompson made a rare appearance in a big-budget Hollywood film when she played the head Agent in Men in Black 3 – a continuation of the sci-fi comedy franchise starring Will Smith, Tommy Lee Jones, and Josh Brolin. With a worldwide gross of $624 million, MIB3 ranks as Thompson's highest-grossing release outside of the Harry Potter films. This mainstream success continued with the Pixar film Brave, in which Thompson voiced Elinor – the Scottish queen despairing at her daughter's defiance against tradition. It was her second consecutive blockbuster release, and critics were generally kind to the film. Also in 2012, Thompson played Queen Elizabeth II in an episode of Playhouse Presents, which dramatised an incident in 1982 when an intruder broke into the Queen's bedroom. Her first film of 2013 was the fantasy romance Beautiful Creatures, in which she played an evil mother. The film aimed to capitalise on the success of The Twilight Saga, but was poorly reviewed and a box office disappointment. Film critic Peter Travers was critical of Thompson's performance and "outrageously awful Southern accent", and feared "the damage this crock may do to [her] reputation".

Saving Mr. Banks, which depicted the making of Mary Poppins, starred Thompson in a leading role as P. L. Travers, the curmudgeonly author of the source novel, alongside Tom Hanks as Walt Disney. Her performance, in contrast to her widely panned appearance in Beautiful Creatures, was received enthusiastically, with one journalist writing "Emma Thompson is back, firing on all cylinders." She found it to be the best script she had read in years and was delighted to be offered the role. She considered it the most challenging of her career because she had "never really played anyone quite so contradictory or difficult before", but found the inconsistent and complicated character "a blissful joy to embody". The film was well-received, grossed $112 million worldwide, and Thompson's performance garnered critical acclaim. The review in The Independent expressed thanks that her "playing of Travers is so deft that we instantly warm to her, and forgive her her snobbery", while Total Film's critic felt that Thompson brought depth to the "predictable" film with "her best performance in years". Thompson was nominated for Best Actress at the BAFTAs, SAGs and Golden Globes, and was awarded the Lead Actress trophy from the National Board of Review. Meryl Streep, her co-star in Angels in America, admitted to being "shocked" at Thompson's failure to receive an Oscar nomination for Saving Mr. Banks.

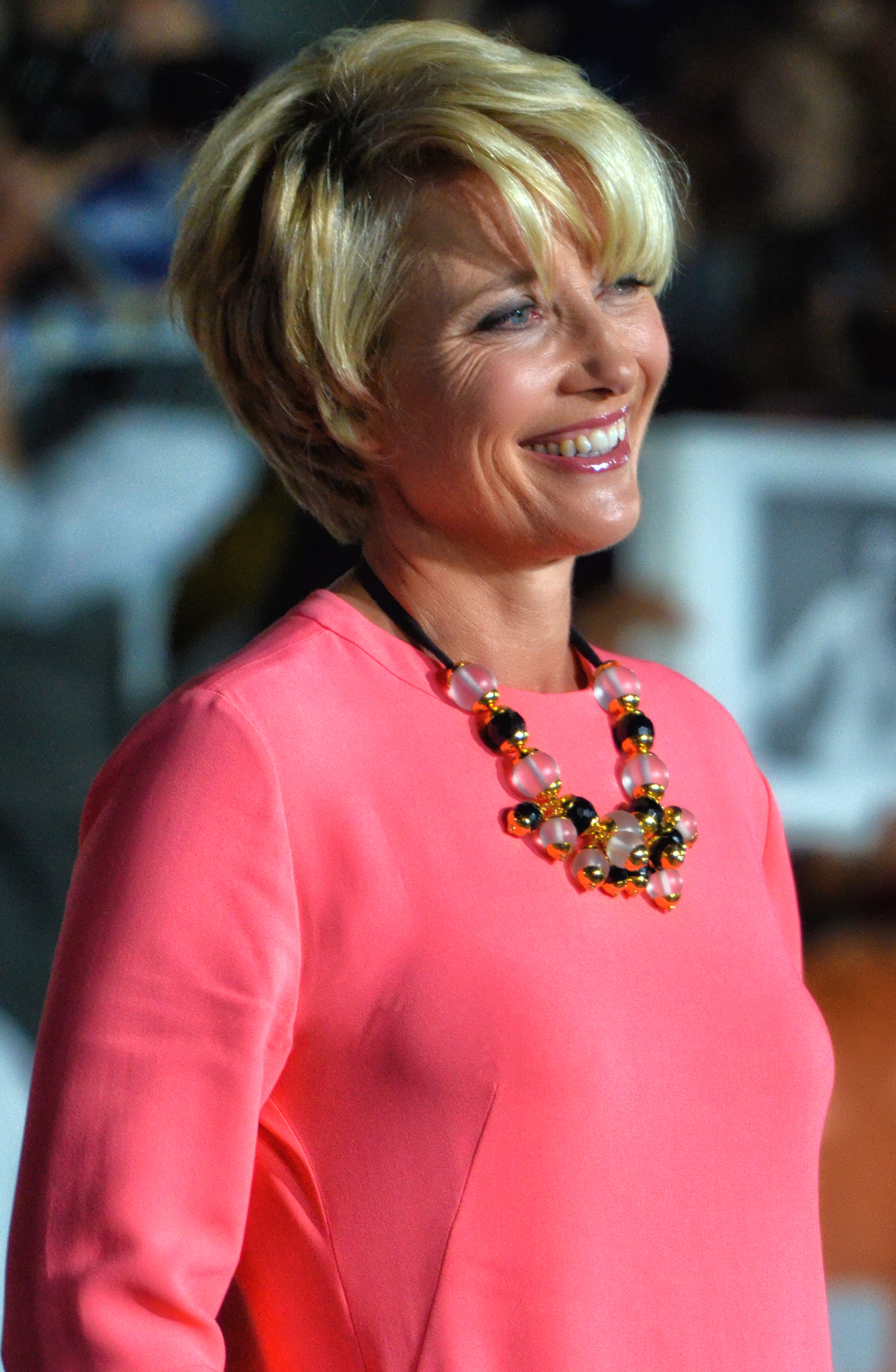
Thompson attending the premiere of The Love Punch at the 2013 Toronto International Film Festival

The romantic comedy The Love Punch (2013) gave Thompson her second consecutive leading role, where she played half of a divorced couple who reunite to steal the man's ex-boss's diamond. In March 2014, she made her first stage appearance in 24 years – and her New York debut – in a Lincoln Center production of Sweeney Todd: The Demon Barber of Fleet Street. She appeared in the musical for five nights, and her "playful" performance of Mrs Lovett was highly praised; the critic Kayla Epstein wrote that she "not only held her own against more experienced vocalists, but wound up running off with the show". She received her sixth Primetime Emmy Award nomination, specifically for Outstanding Lead Actress in a Limited Series or Movie for the televised performance. In 2014, Thompson provided the narration for Jason Reitman's comedy-drama film, Men, Women & Children.

The period drama Effie Gray, a project that she had been working on for many years, based on the true-life story of John Ruskin's disastrous marriage, was written by Thompson but became the subject of a copyright suit before being cleared for cinemas. The American playwright Gregory Murphy said that Thompson's screenplay was an infringement on his play and screenplay The Countess, which he claimed he had submitted to Thompson through a mutual friend in 2003 to consider the role of Elizabeth Eastlake in a proposed film of his play, and to Thompson's husband Greg Wise through a casting director to consider the role of John Ruskin in the play's 2005 West End production. In 2008, Thompson announced that she and Wise "had written a script together about John Ruskin, the Victorian art critic, which we want to make into a film." After meeting with Thompson and her producers, Potboiler Productions, Murphy was offered a screenwriting fee and co-screenwriting credit with Thompson in settlement of his claim. This settlement offer was later abandoned by Thompson, Greg Wise and their partner Donald Rosenfeld, when their company Sovereign Films took over production of the film and instigated the suit, creating the independent entity Effie Film, LLC to litigate it.

In March 2013, District Court Judge Thomas P. Griesa, after allowing Thompson to submit a second revised screenplay into evidence from which Murphy claimed "some of the most troubling material" had been removed, ruled that while there were similarities, the screenplays were "quite dissimilar in their two approaches to fictionalising the same historical events". In response to Murphy's attorney's concerns that the completed film Effie Gray would not adhere to Thompson's second revised screenplay, Judge Griesa concluded his ruling by saying that Thompson's film would not infringe Murphy's play or screenplay "only to the extent that it does not substantially deviate from the 29 November 2011 screenplay," the date of Thompson's second revised screenplay. In May 2013, Effie Gray's Cannes Film Festival premiere was cancelled. In October 2013, the film was withdrawn from the Mill Valley Film Festival in California due to "unforeseen circumstances" according to producer Rosenfeld. In December 2013, Thompson said of the still unreleased Effie Gray that its "time has probably passed," comparing it to another project of hers that "didn't happen either". Effie Gray was released in October 2014, to a modest reception. Thompson plays Elizabeth Eastlake and Greg Wise plays John Ruskin. They both declined to promote the film. Camilla Long, reviewing Effie Gray in The Sunday Times, wrote "nothing fits together" and "no one seems to know why they made this film. Where is Thompson's passion and commitment, or any hint of what she intended to achieve." Manohla Dargis in her review in The New York Times called Effie Gray "The cinematic equivalent of a Brazilian wax, the movie omits much of the story's most interesting material to create something that's been smoothly denatured."

Thompson's first film of 2015 was A Walk in the Woods, a comedy adapted from the book by Bill Bryson of which she co-starred with Robert Redford and Nick Nolte. She next starred in The Legend of Barney Thomson. Her role was a 77-year-old foul-mouthed, chain-smoking, Glaswegian former prostitute, the mother of the title character. Neither film was a critical success, although the latter received some positive reviews and Empire magazine wrote that Thomson was "unforgettable". Later that year, she had a supporting role in the restaurant-based film Burnt. In 2016, she starred in the World War II-drama Alone in Berlin, based on the story of Otto and Elise Hampel. She also co-wrote the screenplay for Bridget Jones's Baby and appeared in the film as a doctor.

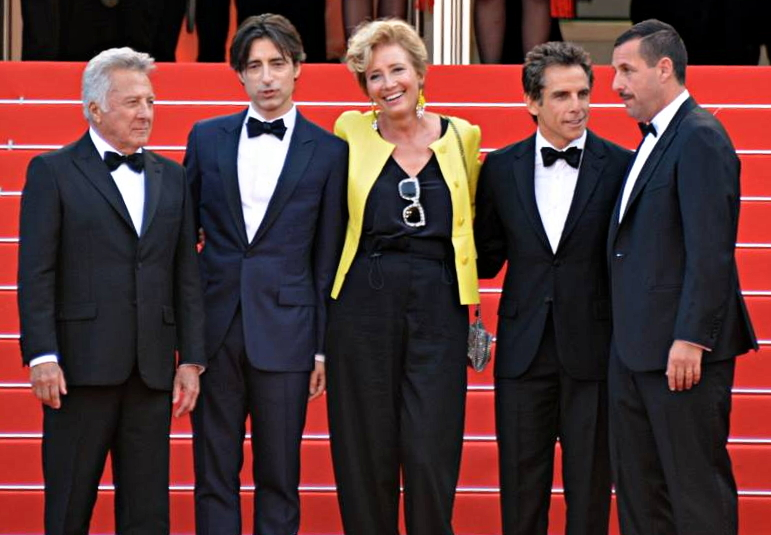
Thompson (centre) attending the premiere of The Meyerowitz Stories at the 2017 Cannes Film Festival

In 2017, Thompson appeared in a supporting role as Mrs. Potts (originally voiced by Angela Lansbury in the 1991 animated film) in Disney's live-action adaptation of Beauty and the Beast, directed by Bill Condon and starring her Harry Potter co-star Emma Watson in the leading role of Belle, alongside Dan Stevens as the Beast. The film received positive reviews and grossed $1.2 billion worldwide, making it the highest-grossing live-action musical film, the second highest-grossing film of 2017, and the 17th highest-grossing film of all time. She also had a supporting role as a hippy in the Noah Baumbach-directed dramedy The Meyerowitz Stories, which premiered at the Cannes Film Festival to critical acclaim. She followed it with a starring role in the film The Children Act, a drama about a family who refuse cancer treatment for their son based on religious beliefs. She had a cameo role as Queen Elizabeth I in the 2017 Christmas special of the BBC sitcom Upstart Crow.

In 2018, Thompson provided the voiceover for Greenpeace's palm-oil awareness commercial which Iceland (supermarket) picked to promote as their 2018 Christmas advertisement. The commercial was rejected by the advertising organisation Clearcast due to Greenpeace's alleged involvement in politics, thus violating their code of conduct. Also that year, she was made a Dame Commander of the Order of the British Empire (DBE) in the 2018 Birthday Honours for services to drama. In 2018, she also starred in Johnny English Strikes Again as the prime minister of the United Kingdom alongside Rowan Atkinson.

Thompson starred in the comedy-drama Late Night (2019), which was written by Mindy Kaling (who also co-starred in that film) and featured her as a popular television host who hires a new writer to keep the show from getting replaced. The film received positive reviews, with Thompson being singled out for praise, and Owen Gleiberman of Variety remarked that "Thompson truly seems like a born talk-show host. Even when she's just riffing, she grounds Late Night in something real." She was nominated for a Golden Globe Award for Best Actress – Motion Picture Comedy or Musical. In the same year, she voiced as the Yeti Elder in the stop-motion animated film Missing Link, reprised her role as Agent O in a more substantial part in Men in Black: International, and co-produced and co-starred alongside Emilia Clarke and Henry Golding in the festive romantic comedy Last Christmas, which was based on the song of the same name by George Michael, and was written by Thompson, her husband Greg Wise, and Bryony Kimmings.

In 2021, Thompson starred opposite Emma Stone as the titular protagonist villain in Cruella, a Disney live-action spin-off/reboot of One Hundred and One Dalmatians, directed by Craig Gillespie, which was released on 28 May 2021 to positive reviews and has grossed $233 million worldwide against its $100 million budget., She won praise from critics for the role of the Baroness with Alonso Duralde from The Wrap writing, "Thompson sinking every last tooth into a role that's half Miranda Priestly and half Reynolds Woodcock." In 2022, Thompson starred opposite Daryl McCormack in the sex comedy-drama Good Luck to You, Leo Grande, written by Katy Brand and directed by Sophie Hyde.

Thompson plays the authoritarian headmistress Miss Trunchbull in the film adaptation of Matilda the Musical, which in turn is based on the novel of the same name by Roald Dahl. It is directed by Matthew Warchus, with a script written by Dennis Kelly and songs composed by Tim Minchin. Following its world premiere at the BFI London Film Festival on 5 October 2022, film critic Robbie Collin of The Telegraph wrote Thompson's portrayal of Trunchbull is "a deranged villain to remember". The Guardian critic Peter Bradshaw stated "the gleefully sly comedy kindred spirits of Thompson and Minchin come together to form the film's bedrock of naughtiness". In 2022, she also starred alongside Lily James and Sajal Aly in the romantic comedy What's Love Got to Do with It?

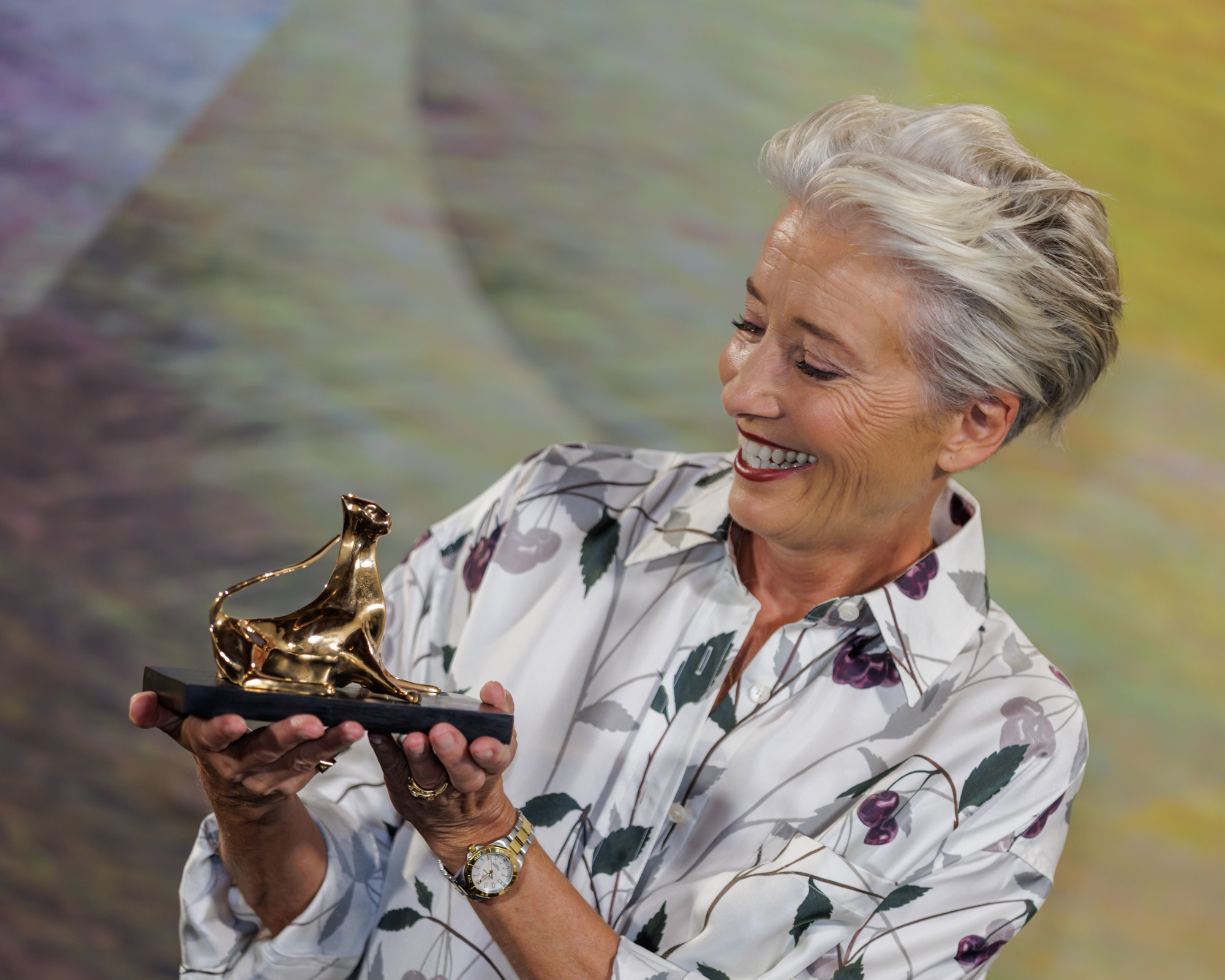
Thompson at the 78th Locarno Film Festival

In the upcoming film Dead of Winter, directed by Brian Kirk, Thompson is attached to star alongside Laurel Marsden and Judy Greer. The film was shot in the 2024 winter in North Karelia, Finland, where Thompson praised the skills of the local working crew, even writing a laudatory letter dedicated to the Finns, published by Helsingin Sanomat. Because of this, the Finnish president Alexander Stubb personally called Thompson and thanked the actress "for her beautiful words, trust in Finns and welcomed her back to Finland".

In 2026 she appeared in and was executive producer for Everybody to Kenmure Street.

== Reception and acting style ==
Thompson is regarded to be among the best actresses of her generation and one of Britain's most recognisable actresses, held in high regard within Hollywood. Early in her career she was closely associated with her first husband, Kenneth Branagh. She became one of the key actresses of the 1990s. Her status has continued to grow; in 2008, journalist Sarah Sands stated that Thompson has improved with age and experience, and Mark Kermode said of her performances, "There is something about her which is — you just trust her. You just think 'I'm in proper hands here.' ... She's up there with the great, I mean really great, British female performers".

"I am an instinctive actress. I don't have technique because I never learnt any. I do the cerebral bit before I start. Then I just let it be. I allow whatever rises to rise naturally. You are tricking your subconscious. I work from the inside out."

— Thompson on her approach to acting

Thompson is particularly known for playing reticent women, and Sands describes her as "the best actress of our times on suffering borne with poignant dignity". According to Kate Kellaway of The Guardian, she specialises in playing "a good woman in a frock". She often brings her real personality to her roles, and Kellaway believes that her lack of conventional beauty contributes to her likeability as an actress.

Thompson also plays many haughty characters, with a "bracing, nanny-like demeanour", but she is noted for her ability to win the empathy of audiences. Thompson belongs to a group of highly decorated British actresses including Judi Dench, Kate Winslet and Helena Bonham Carter who are known for appearing in "heritage films" and typically showing "restraint, rendering emotions through intellect rather than feelings, and a sense of irony, which demonstrates the heroine's superior understanding". Projecting a typically "British image", Thompson's often dogmatic and tight-jawed manner has also been compared to that of Maggie Smith.

With a background in comedy, Thompson's performances are typically delivered with an ironic touch. Ang Lee, director of Sense and Sensibility, stated that Thompson's comedic approach may be her greatest asset as an actress, remarking, "Emma is an extremely funny lady. Like Austen, she's laughing at her own culture while she's a part of it." Thompson has stated that the "most moving things are often also funny, in life and in art" which is present in her film work.

== Writing ==
In 2012, Thompson wrote The Further Tale of Peter Rabbit as an addition to the Peter Rabbit series by Beatrix Potter to commemorate the 110th anniversary of the publication of The Tale of Peter Rabbit. She was approached by the publishers to write it, the first authorised Peter story since 1930 and the only one not written by Potter. The book falls in the middle of the earlier series, rather than at the end, and takes Peter Rabbit outside of Mr. McGregor's garden and into Scotland. It was a New York Times Best Seller. In 2013, Thompson wrote a second book in the series titled The Christmas Tale of Peter Rabbit. A third book, The Spectacular Tale of Peter Rabbit, was released in 2014. In 2018, Thompson said she would like to write about "what it's like being human now".

== Other work ==
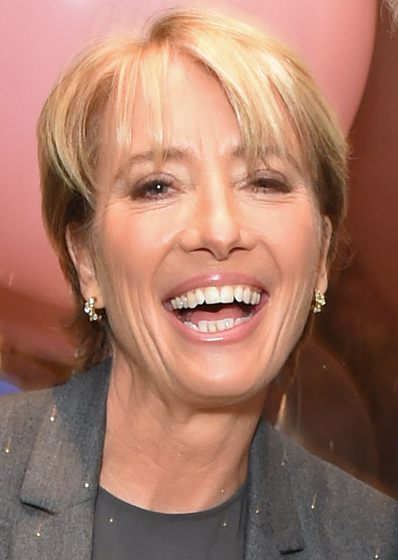
A Boodles client, Thompson at the 2015 launch party for the luxury British jewellers' flagship store in Bond Street, London

In 2014, Thompson was among a group of influential British women, which included Annie Lennox and Rita Ora, to feature in the latest iteration of British retailer Marks & Spencer's 'Leading Ladies' marketing campaign.

== Acting credits and accolades ==
Thompson has won two Academy Awards, for Best Actress in James Ivory's Howards End (1992) and for Best Adapted Screenplay for Ang Lee's Sense and Sensibility (1995), and been nominated for three others. Thompson has also received three BAFTA Awards, two Golden Globe Awards, and a Primetime Emmy Award, in addition to nominations for two Grammy Awards, two Independent Spirit Awards, and six Screen Actors Guild Awards. In 2018, she was made a Dame (DBE) by Queen Elizabeth II for her contributions to drama. She was elected a Fellow of the Royal Society of Literature in 2021.

On 29 October 2025, she started appearing as Zoë Boehm in Down Cemetery Road for Apple TV+ alongside Ruth Wilson as Sarah Trafford. This was her first regular television role since 2019 when she appeared as Vivienne Rook MP in Years and Years for BBC One and HBO.

== Personal life ==
Thompson has stated that she feels Scottish, "not only because I am half Scottish but also because I've spent half my life [in Scotland]". She frequently returns to Scotland and visits Dunoon in Argyll and Bute. She owns a home nearby, on the shore of Loch Eck.

=== Relationships ===
Thompson's first husband was actor and director Kenneth Branagh, whom she met in 1987 while filming the television series Fortunes of War. They married in 1989 and appeared in several films together, with Branagh often casting her in his productions. Dubbed a "golden couple" by the British press, their relationship received substantial media coverage. The pair attempted to keep the relationship private, refusing to be interviewed or photographed together. Thompson and Branagh announced their separation in September 1995 and divorced in 1997. They cited their work schedules as the reason, but it later emerged that he was having an affair with actress Helena Bonham Carter.

Thompson reported that on the day her divorce became final, Donald Trump called her unexpectedly while she was in her trailer on the set of the 1998 film Primary Colors, to ask her on a date. She later joked that had she accepted, she "could have changed the course of American history!"

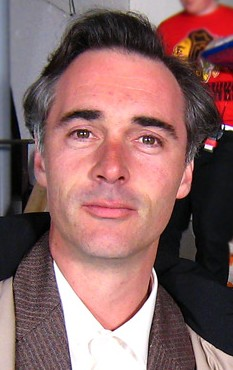
Thompson's husband, Greg Wise, whom she met on the set of Sense and Sensibility

Thompson was living alone as her relationship with Branagh deteriorated and she became depressed. While filming Sense and Sensibility in 1995, she began a relationship with her co-star Greg Wise. On how she was able to overcome her depression, she stated, "Work saved me and Greg saved me. He picked up the pieces and put them together again." The couple have a daughter, who was conceived via IVF when Thompson was 39.

Thompson and Wise married in Dunoon, Scotland, in 2003. The family's permanent residence is in West Hampstead, London, on the same road as her childhood home. Also in 2003, Thompson and Wise informally adopted a Rwandan orphan and former child soldier. They met at a Refugee Council event when he was sixteen, and Thompson invited him to spend Christmas at their home. "Slowly," Thompson has commented, "he became a sort of permanent fixture, came on holiday to Scotland with us, became part of the family." Agaba became a British citizen in 2009. On 28 February 2020, Thompson and Wise were declared residents of Venice. The couple own homes in West Hampstead, London; Scotland; and Venice.

=== Views and activism ===
Thompson has said of her religious views:

I'm an atheist [...] I regard religion with fear and suspicion. It's not enough to say that I don't believe in God. I actually regard the system as distressing: I am offended by some of the things said in the Bible and the Qur'an and I refute them.

She is a supporter of the Labour Party and endorsed Jeremy Corbyn's campaign in both the 2015 and 2016 Labour Party leadership elections. She has also expressed support for the now-defunct Women's Equality Party.

Thompson has been a campaigner since her youth. Since becoming a public figure, she has regularly voiced her views and been involved in many issues, prompting criticism that she is overly outspoken. She has justified her assertiveness by saying, "[W]hat I feel is that we all need to speak up and a woman who has got a louder voice needs to shout very loudly indeed."

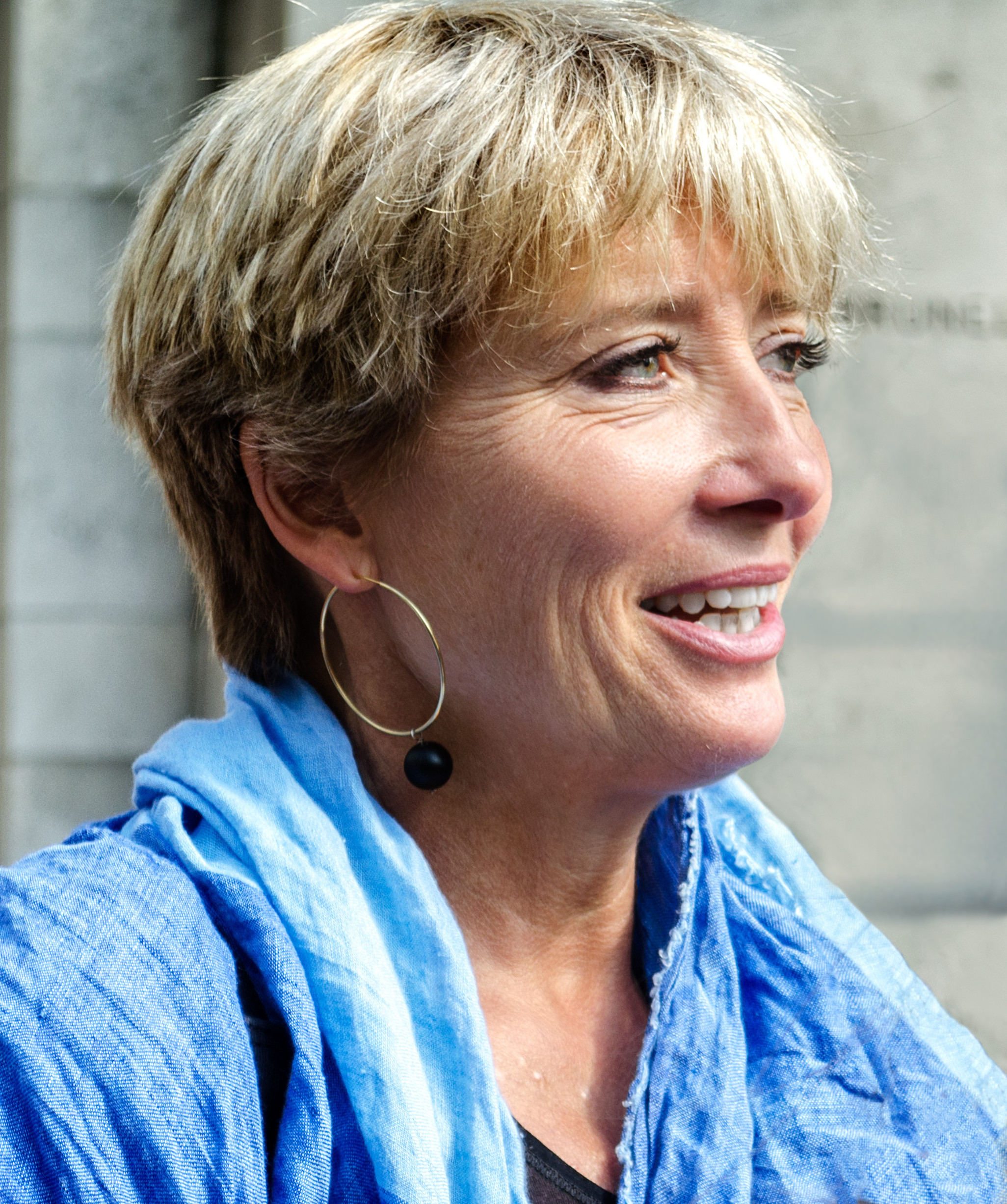
Thompson at the 2014 Climate March in London

She is particularly active in human rights work. She is chair of the Helen Bamber Foundation for the Care of Victims of Torture, a patron of the Refugee Council, and has a therapy room in her office for traumatised refugees. In 2017, she marched in support of Nazanin Zaghari-Ratcliffe, an Iranian-British charity worker who was held captive in Iran. Thompson is a patron of the Elton John AIDS Foundation, and Time magazine named her a "European Hero" in 2009 in recognition of "her work to highlight the plight of AIDS sufferers in Africa".

She is an active environmentalist and a supporter of Greenpeace; in January 2009, as part of her campaign against climate change, she and three other members of the organisation bought land near the village of Sipson to deter the building of a third runway for Heathrow Airport. In August 2014, Thompson and her daughter Gaia went on a Greenpeace "Save the Arctic" expedition to raise awareness of the dangers of drilling for oil. She narrated The Real News Network's The Doubt Machine: Inside the Koch Brothers' War on Climate Science, a documentary short about Koch Industries and its efforts to discredit climate research, which was released on 31 October 2016. She supported the London Extinction Rebellion rally against climate change in 2019, although she received some criticism for having flown 5,400 miles (8,700 km) to attend it. She is also an ambassador for the Galapagos Conservation Trust.

On 24 February 2024, Thompson appeared in a video with 29 other world stars to support Ukraine against Russia.

== See also ==
- List of Academy Award winners and nominees from Great Britain
- List of Academy Award records
- List of actors with Academy Award nominations
- List of actors with more than one Academy Award nomination in the acting categories
- List of atheists in film, radio, television and theatre
- List of British actors
- List of Primetime Emmy Award winners
- List of Golden Globe winners
