= Thompson (TV series) =

- Genre: Variety comedy
- Directed by: John Stroud
- Starring: Emma Thompson; Kenneth Branagh; Imelda Staunton; Stephen Moore
- Country of origin: United Kingdom
- Original language: English
- No. of seasons: 1
- No. of episodes: 6

Original release
- Network: BBC
- Release: 10 November – 15 December 1988

Thompson is a 1988 British television variety series starring actress Emma Thompson. The show also featured Imelda Staunton, Kenneth Branagh and Stephen Moore. "Her series features the whole range—monologues, mimicry, sketches, outrageous costumes, songs and dance," noted journalist Marcel Berlins at the time. Thompson's theme music was Dave Brubeck's "Unsquare Dance."
