= The Love Punch =

2013 film

- Theatrical release poster
- Directed by: Joel Hopkins
- Written by: Joel Hopkins
- Produced by: Jean-Charles Levy; Clément Miserez; Tim Perell; Nicola Usborne
- Starring: Pierce Brosnan; Emma Thompson; Timothy Spall; Celia Imrie; Louise Bourgoin; Laurent Lafitte
- Cinematography: Jérôme Alméras
- Edited by: Susan Littenberg
- Music by: Jean-Michel Bernard
- Distributed by: Entertainment One (UK)
- Release dates: 12 September 2013 (TIFF); 18 April 2014 (UK)
- Running time: 95 minutes
- Country: United Kingdom
- Language: English
- Box office: $4.8 million

The Love Punch is a 2013 British comedy heist film written and directed by Joel Hopkins, starring Pierce Brosnan and Emma Thompson.

Divorcees Richard and Kate Jones band together to recover the retirement money that was stolen from them.

The film was screened in the Gala Presentation section at the 2013 Toronto International Film Festival.

== Plot ==
Richard and Kate Jones are divorcees with two children, Sophie and Matt. Soon after Richard's company is sold to the corrupt French businessman Vincent and a week before he is meant to retire, the company's pension plan is lost, including all of Richard and Kate's investments for the whole family.

Pushing aside their differences to band together, the Joneses go to Paris and confront Vincent. He makes no apologies, insisting everything was done legally. After being thrown out of the building, they regroup.

Richard and Kate plot to get their money back. When they find out that Vincent is marrying his beautiful girlfriend Manon, they plan to steal the $10 million diamond he gave to her. Its value would broadly cover the pension funds Vincent drained from the company.

Richard and Kate follow Vincent and Manon to the south of France, where the wedding will take place. Kate first makes contact with Manon at her bachelorette beach party by pretending to be a distant British relative. Their son Matt helps them find invited guests they could impersonate.

Richard and Kate enlist their friends Jerry and Penelope to help them, as Matt found two pairs of Texans attending the wedding. Once they incapacitate the Americans, their intention is to infiltrate the reception, switch the diamond for a fake and pass it to Jerry and Penelope so that they will not be suspected.

An added complication is that, in addition to having invitations to the remote location of the reception, guests will be fingerprinted. To bypass the checkpoint, the four use wet suits, snorkels and goggles to swim there, then climbing gear to scale the cliffs. Doning their Texan disguises, they head in.

Having infiltrated the wedding, the Joneses attempt to take the diamond, but are interrupted by a tearful Manon, who confesses her doubts about the wedding to Kate. After Kate offers her advice on marriage, Manon learns about their motives for being there and decides to give them the diamond of her own free will.

Vincent realizes the switch after Manon officially calls the wedding off, but Jerry and Penelope are able to get out with the diamond after Jerry swallows it. Richard and Kate are nearly sent over a cliff in a van, but Manon is able to intercept it and save them, allowing Kate to call a contact with a boat to pick them up.

Having sold the diamond to a contact of Jerry's for $15 million, Richard and Kate decide to spend some time traveling. They have grown closer during the heist and want to spend some time together. Meanwhile, Jerry and Penelope take the money back to England to disperse it to Richard's former employees.

== Cast ==
- Emma Thompson as Kate Jones
- Pierce Brosnan as Richard Jones
- Celia Imrie as Penelope
- Timothy Spall as Jerry
- Louise Bourgoin as Manon Fontane
- Laurent Lafitte as Vincent Kruger
- Marisa Berenson as Catherine
- Olivier Chantreau as Jean-Baptiste Durain
- Ellen Thomas as Doreen
- Tuppence Middleton as Sophie Jones
- Jack Wilkinson as Matt Jones
- Adam Byron as Tyler
- John Ramm as Ken
- Eleanor Matsuura as Michaela
- Linda Hardy as Glaxo secretary
- Sabine Crossen as Texan couple woman 1
- Julie Ordon as Girl 1 beach club
- Tom Morton as Tim
- Catriona MacColl as Wedding guest

== Reception ==
Peter Bradshaw, writing in The Guardian, gave the film 3 stars saying that it is an "entirely ridiculous, cheerfully daft and very amiable midlife comedy".
