= The Doubt Machine: Inside the Koch Brothers' War on Climate Science =

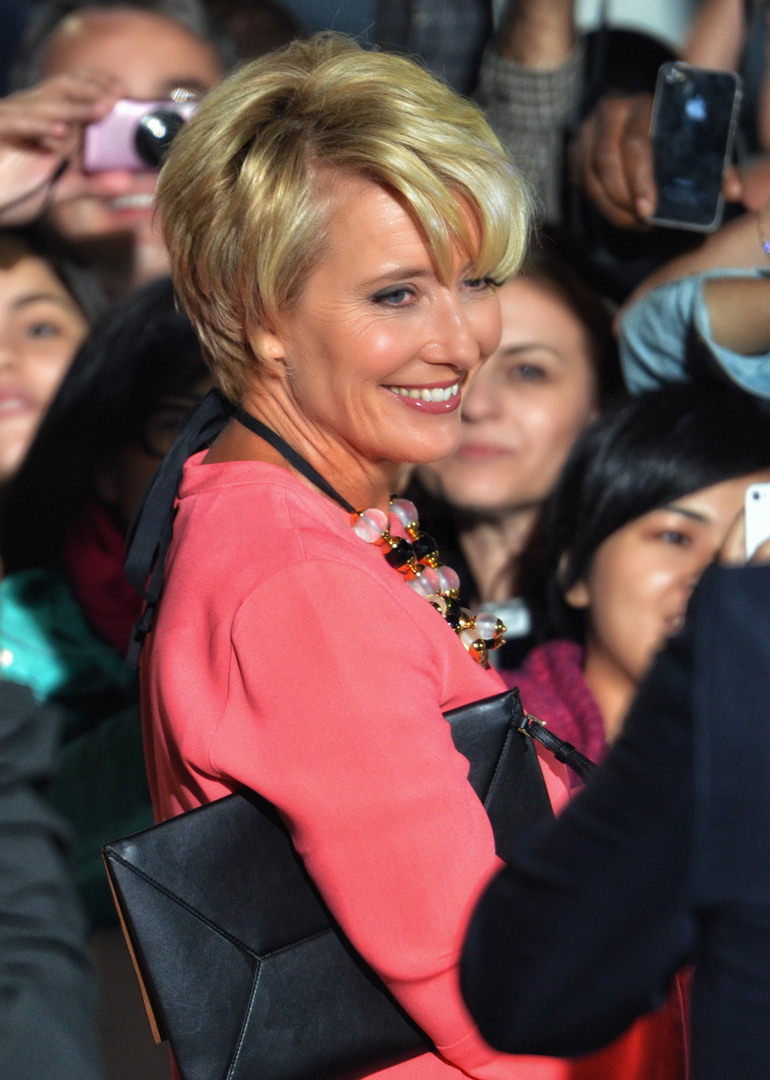
The narrator, Emma Thompson in 2013

The Doubt Machine: Inside the Koch Brothers' War on Climate Science is a 2016 documentary short about Koch Industries and its efforts to discredit climate research. Released by The Real News Network on October 31, it was narrated by actress Emma Thompson.
