= Tutti Frutti (1987 TV series) =

1987 British TV drama series

- Tutti Frutti DVD cover
- Genre: Comedy drama
- Written by: John Byrne
- Directed by: Tony Smith
- Starring: Robbie Coltrane; Emma Thompson
- Theme music composer: Zoot Money
- Country of origin: Scotland
- Original language: English
- No. of episodes: 6

Production
- Producer: Andy Park
- Running time: 60–68 mins
- Production company: BBC Scotland

Original release
- Release: 3 March – 7 April 1987

Tutti Frutti is a BBC Scotland six-part drama series, transmitted in 1987 and written by John Byrne. It starred Robbie Coltrane, Emma Thompson, Maurice Roëves, Richard Wilson and Katy Murphy. It won six BAFTAs and brought many of the cast to national prominence.

== Plot ==
The Majestics, a legendary Scots rock 'n' roll band, are on the eve of their 1986 "Silver Jubilee" tour, and find themselves in trouble when their lead singer, Big Jazza McGlone (Coltrane), is killed in a car crash.

The group's devious and exploitative manager Eddie Clockerty (Wilson) talks Big Jazza's younger brother, Danny (also Coltrane), home from New York for the funeral, into joining the band as their new lead singer. Suzi Kettles (Thompson), a sharp cookie and old classmate of Danny, picks up the guitar and also joins the band. From that moment, the ill-fated tour and the band's fortunes appear to take a turn for the better.

The Majestics' final dispiriting tour of Scotland's less salubrious clubs and pubs is punctuated by childish backstage squabbling and a series of personal disasters. Ageing heart-throb Vincent Diver (Roëves), 'the iron man of Scottish Rock', is cheating on his wife Noreen (a community nurse and sister of drummer Bomba) with girlfriend Glenna (played by Fiona Chalmers as simultaneously pathetic, manipulative and glutinously cloying), who has an apparent pregnancy and when the unborn child dies (or maybe never existed from the start), she commits suicide by jumping from a bridge into the Clyde.

Vincent is also knifed in Buckie by a girl who believes she is his illegitimate daughter from a one-night stand on a tour of long ago. Suzi Kettles proves to have an abusive estranged husband, a dentist, in whose teeth Danny drills holes with the dentist's drill for his battering of Suzi. The fractious on-off relationship between rotund Danny McGlone and Suzi adds a further comic dimension, along with the 'double-act' of the dour Mr Clockerty and his lippy secretary Janice Toner (Murphy). In the final sequence, during the Majestics' grand finale concert at Glasgow Pavilion, Vincent douses himself in Polish vodka and sets himself alight.

== Cast ==
- Robbie Coltrane as Danny McGlone / Big Jazza
- Emma Thompson as Suzi Kettles
- Richard Wilson as Eddie Clockerty
- Katy Murphy as Janice Toner
- Maurice Roëves as Vincent Diver
- Stuart McGugan as Bomba MacAteer
- Jake D'Arcy as Francis 'Fud' O'Donnell
- Ron Donachie as Dennis Sproul
- Fiona Chalmers as Glenna McFadden

== Re-release ==
Although it attained 'cult' status, it was only repeated once on BBC Two, albeit only 10 months after its first transmission on BBC One, and was not available on video or DVD. Various rumours circulated for many years as to why, but the BBC never confirmed the reasons. However, in March 2007, John Byrne explained that the problem had been due to a performance of the song "Tutti Frutti" in one episode (not the title sequence) where Danny McGlone changes the lyrics to "here's the rub, she makes me sleep in a tub". This is a reference to an earlier scene where Kettles is coerced into letting McGlone stay at her flat, but insists he sleeps in the bathtub. As a result of this change the BBC's usual music licensing did not apply, and the copyright holder Little Richard requested a prohibitively high fee.

In 2006 a BBC spokesperson stated that these issues were 'resolvable', allowing for a DVD release or BBC Four transmission. John Byrne said he thought the original film stock (including out-takes) may have been destroyed, and that only the broadcast masters may survive.

The BBC released a two-disc Region 2 DVD package of the series on 3 August 2009 in the UK.

In March 2019, BBC Scotland re-broadcast the six original episodes - directly after a documentary about the making of both the series and the stage play, called The Return of The Majestics.

It was broadcast again over three consecutive nights, starting on Boxing Day 2022 (the year of Coltrane's death) on BBC Four, preceded by a short programme in which Richard Wilson recalled his memory of the production. Tutti Frutti was made available on BBC iPlayer in early 2023.

== Stage play ==
In 2006 Byrne reworked the series into a stage play, produced as a co-production between the National Theatre of Scotland and His Majesty's Theatre in Aberdeen, where it opened on 22 September 2006. In 2007 the show toured to the King's Theatre, Glasgow, the King's Theatre, Edinburgh and the Grand Theatre, Blackpool.

== Episodes ==
No.	Title	Original release date
1	"The Boy Can't Help It"	3 March 1987
2	"On the Road Again"	10 March 1987
3	"Gin a Body Dig a Body..."	17 March 1987
4	"Don't You Rock Me Daddy-O"	24 March 1987
5	"Love Hurts"	31 March 1987
6	"A Wop-Boppa Loo-Bop a Wop-Bam Boom"	7 April 1987

== Awards ==
The series won six BAFTAs in 1988.

- Best Actress – Emma Thompson
- Best Drama Series – Andy Park, Tony Smith
- Best Graphics – Sandi Anderson, John Byrne
- Best Make Up – Lorna Blair
- Best Sound Supervisor – Brian Dewar
- Best VTR Editor – Peter Hayes

Preceded by The Life and Loves of a She-Devil	British Academy Television Awards; Best Drama Series or Serial; 1988	Succeeded by A Very British Coup
