= Last Chance Harvey =

2008 film by Joel Hopkins

- Theatrical release poster
- Directed by: Joel Hopkins
- Written by: Joel Hopkins
- Produced by: Tim Perell; Nicola Usborne
- Starring: Dustin Hoffman; Emma Thompson; Kathy Baker; James Brolin
- Cinematography: John de Borman
- Edited by: Robin Sales
- Music by: Dickon Hinchliffe
- Distributed by: Overture Films (United States); Paramount Vantage (International)
- Release date: December 25, 2008
- Running time: 92 minutes
- Country: United States
- Language: English
- Budget: $5 million
- Box office: $32.5 million

Last Chance Harvey is a 2008 American romantic drama film written and directed by Joel Hopkins. The screenplay focuses on two lonely people who tentatively forge a relationship during two days. Dustin Hoffman plays the title character, Harvey Shine, an American television commercial jingles composer who travels to England for his estranged daughter's wedding and promptly loses his job. Emma Thompson plays an airport hospitality worker with a jaundiced view of relationships.

== Plot ==
Divorced American Harvey Shine writes television commercial jingles despite being a jazz pianist and composer. As he departs for his daughter Susan's wedding in London, his job is tenuous. On arrival at Heathrow Airport, he encounters single Londoner Kate Walker, who collects statistics from passengers as they pass through the terminals. Harvey brusquely dismisses her, for he is eager to get to his hotel.

At the hotel, Harvey finds he is the only wedding guest booked there, as the house his ex-wife Jean has rented is for all the US guests, except him. At the rehearsal dinner, Harvey is clearly an outsider to his daughter's life, and is excluded from Jean's new husband Brian's clan. Their insincere politeness makes him uncomfortable.

Harvey tells Susan that he can attend the ceremony but not the reception, for he has to urgently return to the States. She replies that, as Brian has been more of a father to her recently than he, she prefers that Brian walk her down the aisle.

Meanwhile, Kate is on an unsuccessful blind date. After a call from her neurotic mother, Maggie, she returns to the table to find her date has invited some of his friends to join them. Feeling excluded, she goes home.

The next morning, Harvey is slighted when he is seated at the back of the church, rather than near his daughter. He leaves for the airport immediately after the ceremony, but heavy London traffic causes him to miss his flight. Calling his boss about the delay, he is fired. Drinking in the airport bar, he recognizes Kate from the day before. He apologizes for his rude behavior, and she initially resists his attention. Soon, they are both glad to finally have an honest, genuine conversation.

Harvey does not want to stay in an airport hotel, so he follows Kate, joining her on the train to Paddington station. He walks with her to her writing class on the South Bank. Kate is pleased when he meets her afterwards. As they stroll along the River Thames, Harvey mentions he is missing the wedding reception, and Kate urges him to go.

Harvey relents, but only if Kate accompanies him. Insisting she is not properly dressed, Harvey buys her a dress. At the Grosvenor House Hotel, they are welcomed by Susan and placed at the children's table, the only seats still available. When the "father of the bride" is called to make a toast, Brian starts to speak, but Harvey interrupts, for he is her biological father. His touching, eloquent speech redeems him with Susan, and endears him to Kate.

After the couple's first dance as husband and wife, the groom calls Harvey to dance with Susan. He happily does so; and everyone joins them on the dance floor. As Harvey is enjoying himself, Kate is left alone at the children's table. Feeling out of place and seemingly forgotten, Kate quietly leaves, but Harvey realizes she has gone.

Harvey sees her at the elevator, ducks into a nearby room, and begins to softly play jazz. Hearing the music, Kate finds Harvey smiling and waiting for her. He asks her to return to the reception so he can "dance her socks off". She agrees, and they have a great time.

Afterwards, they walk and talk through London until dawn. On parting, they exchange a single, gentle kiss, agreeing to meet at noon that day. Back at his hotel, Harvey has serious heart palpitations after faulty lifts force him to use the stairs. In the hospital, he is forced to stay for treatment and misses the appointment with Kate, who turns up and waits for him.

When Harvey is discharged the next day, his boss calls and asks him to return immediately, for they've been unable to handle an important account without him. He declines, preferring to stay to try to make amends with Kate.

He calls Kate at work to explain, but she refuses to take the call. He looks for her at the airport, and finally tracks her down at her writing class. Explaining why he missed their rendezvous, he says he wants them to pursue a relationship. Fearing emotional pain, she resists, but finally agrees to try.

As they stroll along the South Bank, Harvey suggests she ask him the questions she originally had for him at the airport. When she asks him for his place of residence, he says it is "in transition".

== Cast ==
- Dustin Hoffman as Harvey Shine
- Emma Thompson as Kate Walker
- Eileen Atkins as Maggie Walker
- Kathy Baker as Jean
- James Brolin as Brian
- Liane Balaban as Susan Shine
- Daniel Lapaine as Scott Wright
- Richard Schiff as Marvin
- Dennis Gimes as Bus Driver
- Adam Astill as Businessman
- Bronagh Gallagher as Oonagh

== Production ==
According to interviews with stars Emma Thompson and Dustin Hoffman in An Unconventional Love Story: The Making of Last Chance Harvey, a bonus feature on the DVD release of the film, the two had wanted to collaborate again since working together in Stranger Than Fiction in 2006. When screenwriter and director Joel Hopkins approached her with the script, Thompson suggested he tailor it to accommodate Hoffman, who agreed to portray Harvey if Hopkins would allow his actors the leeway to improvise some of their scenes. Hopkins complied, and several of Harvey and Kate's conversations were ad-libbed while keeping within the dictates of the plot.

London locations in the film include Willesden Green, Belsize Park, Green Park, Maida Vale, the Millennium Dome on the Greenwich peninsula, the east Golden Jubilee Bridge, the Royal National Theatre at Southbank Centre, Paddington station, Somerset House, St. John's Wood, Waterloo Bridge and Heathrow Airport in Greater London.

== Critical reception ==
The film received mainly positive reviews, and has a 72% rating on Rotten Tomatoes, based on 153 reviews, with an average rating of 6.2 out of 10. The website's critics consensus reads, "Last Chance Harvey is an above-average story that graduates to potent romantic drama based on the chemistry and charm of its top-notch performers." The film has a Metacritic score of 57 out of 100, based on 27 reviews.

Manohla Dargis, film critic for The New York Times, admitted, "There's something irresistible about watching two people fall in love, even in contrived, sniffle- and sometimes gag-inducing films like Last Chance Harvey. I reluctantly gave in to this imperfect movie, despite the cornball dialogue, pedestrian filmmaking, some wincing physical comedy and Mr. Hoffman’s habit of trying to win the audience over by simply staring at the camera with a hapless deadpan that says: Look at me, I’m still cute as a button, still cute as Benjamin in The Graduate, and I’m still kind of lost and still very much in need of your love."

Roger Ebert of the Chicago Sun-Times called the film a "tremendously appealing love story surrounded by a movie not worthy of it. For Dustin Hoffman, it provides a rare chance to play an ordinary guy. For Emma Thompson, there is an opportunity to use her gifts for tact and insecurity. When Last Chance Harvey gets out of their way and leaves them alone to relate with each other, it's sort of magical. Then the lumber of the plot apparatus is trundled on, and we wish it were a piece for two players... [W]hat's good is very good... Pitch perfect. But then the dialogue fades down, and the camera pulls back and shows them talking and smiling freely, and the music gets happier, and there is a montage showing them walking about London with lots and lots of scenery in the frame. Last Chance Harvey has everything it needs but won't stop there. It needs the nerve to push all the way. It is a pleasure to look upon the faces of Hoffman and Thompson, so pleasant, so real. Their dialogue together finds the right notes for crossing an emotional minefield. They never descend into tear-jerking or cuteness. They are all grown up and don't trust love nearly as much as straight talk. Hopkins deserves credit for creating these characters. Then he should have stood back and let them keep right on talking. Their pillow talk would have been spellbinding."

According to film reviewer Mick LaSalle of the San Francisco Chronicle, "One's enjoyment of Last Chance Harvey will depend on how suitable one considers the pairing of these characters and how felicitous one considers the pairing of these performers. The latter is most important, because if you enjoy Hoffman and Thompson together, you might be able to overlook the ghastly prospect of poor Kate's throwing her life away on this guy. To be sure, Thompson and Hoffman are watchable and engaging, and that counts for something. But they don't look right as a couple, and each is more interesting in his or her scenes apart than they are together."

Owen Gleiberman of Entertainment Weekly graded the film B−, calling it "a losers-in-love comedy with no big surprises, but in the age of Internet dating, the prospect of two strangers trying this valiantly to connect in public carries a dash of romantic heroism... These two deserved the intimate incandescence of their own Before Sunrise, rather than the slightly generic sentimentality of a cross-Atlantic Marty. But Hoffman and Thompson are each good enough to bring out a glow in the other."

Marjorie Baumgarten of the Austin Chronicle said, "With its thin plot and its title character an American abroad in London, Last Chance Harvey comes across as something like a Before Sunrise for the less-than-nubile set. Were that writer/director Hopkins' dialogue and visualization as scintillating as Richard Linklater's is in his Sunrise/Sunset romances. Of course, the combined acting brilliance of Hoffman and Thompson could elevate the hoariest of clichés and turn almost anything they touch golden – and that is most often the case with Last Chance Harvey. But no one's skills can transcend the kooky banality of a trying-on-dresses montage or burnish the somewhat creepy way in which Harvey first comes on to Kate. Still, these two prove a pleasure to watch, and their conversations are realistic troves of give and take. ...Middle-aged romances are, sadly, hard to find on the silver screen, so it's with some hesitation I pronounce Last Chance Harvey not up to snuff. Yet if we are to see any more romances starring characters old enough to have witnessed both Hoffman and Thompson winning Oscars, it's our responsibility to go out and support this one."

Claudia Puig of USA Today noted, "The film's biggest asset is the pitch-perfect performances of the two stars. They have a gentle rapport that unfolds convincingly after some initial testiness. It takes two consummate actors to make quickly escalating chemistry feel so natural. We find ourselves heartily rooting for them. Hoffman and Thompson rise above the sometimes obvious story arc, and the result is a surprisingly tender and appealing love story."

Joshua Rothkopf of Time Out New York rated the film three stars out of five, and commented, "If anything can be said to be wrong with so benign an affair, it’s simply that Last Chance Harvey doesn’t feel much like cinema. Little excites the material visually; the film’s dully lensed Blighty lends nothing to the drama. But to watch Hoffman and Thompson work the lines is to witness two extremely unlikely stars recapture the essence of their appeal: The tiny neurotic is suddenly Romeo again, while the cool Brit melts in the light of affection. For some, that will be enough."

== Awards and nominations ==
Dustin Hoffman was nominated for the Golden Globe Award for Best Actor – Motion Picture Musical or Comedy, but lost to Colin Farrell for In Bruges. Emma Thompson was nominated for the Golden Globe Award for Best Actress – Motion Picture Musical or Comedy, but lost to Sally Hawkins for Happy-Go-Lucky.

== Home media ==
Anchor Bay Entertainment released the film on a two-disc DVD set May 5, 2009. On the first disc, the film is presented in an anamorphic widescreen format, with an audio track in English, and subtitles in English and Spanish. Bonus features include commentary with Joel Hopkins, Dustin Hoffman and Emma Thompson, the featurette An Unconventional Love Story: The Making of Last Chance Harvey, and the theatrical trailer. The second disc presents the film in fullscreen format.
