= The Song of Lunch =

British 2010 television adaptation of Christopher Reid's poem

The Song of Lunch is a British 2010 television adaptation of Christopher Reid's poem of the same name. It was directed by Niall MacCormick and stars Alan Rickman and Emma Thompson. Screened on 9 October 2010 during National Poetry Month, the production is unusual in featuring little spoken dialogue, the action instead being an enactment of incidents described in poetic monologue by the male character.

The play tells the story of a reunion between two former lovers in a Soho Italian restaurant. Rickman's character ('he') is a London book editor who writes poetry in his spare time (unsuccessfully). Thompson's character ('she') is his former lover who left him to marry a successful novelist fifteen years previously.

50 minutes long and a co-production between the BBC and Masterpiece, it was filmed in the anamorphic format 2.35:1 aspect ratio. Thompson received an Emmy Award nomination (Outstanding Lead Actress in a Miniseries or a Movie) in 2012 for her performance.
