= Wit (film) =

2001 television movie directed by Mike Nichols

- Genre: Drama
- Based on: Wit by Margaret Edson
- Written by: Emma Thompson; Mike Nichols
- Directed by: Mike Nichols
- Starring: Emma Thompson; Christopher Lloyd; Audra McDonald; Eileen Atkins
- Music by: Henryk Mikolaj Gorecki
- Country of origin: United States
- Original language: English

Production
- Executive producers: Cary Brokaw; Mike Nichols
- Producer: Simon Bosanquet
- Cinematography: Seamus McGarvey
- Editor: John Bloom
- Running time: 98 minutes
- Production companies: HBO Films; Avenue Pictures

Original release
- Network: HBO
- Release: March 24, 2001

Wit is a 2001 American television drama film directed by Mike Nichols. The teleplay by Nichols and Emma Thompson is based on the 1999 Pulitzer Prize-winning play of the same title by Margaret Edson.

The film was shown at the Berlin International Film Festival on February 9, 2001 before being broadcast by HBO on March 24. It was shown at the Edinburgh Film Festival and the Warsaw Film Festival later in the year.

== Plot ==
Vivian Bearing is a professor of English literature known for her intense knowledge of metaphysical poetry, especially the Holy Sonnets of John Donne. Her life takes a turn when she is diagnosed with metastatic Stage IV ovarian cancer. Oncologist Harvey Kelekian prescribes various chemotherapy treatments to treat her disease, and as she suffers through the various side-effects (such as fever, chills, vomiting, and abdominal pain), she attempts to put everything in perspective. The story periodically flashes back to previous moments in her life, including her childhood, her graduate school studies, and her career prior to her diagnosis. During the course of the film, she continually breaks the fourth wall by looking into the camera and expressing her feelings.

As she grows increasingly ill, Vivian agrees to undergo more tests and experimental treatments, even though she realizes the doctors treating her, including former student Jason Posner, see her less as someone to save and more as a guinea pig for their treatments. The only person who seems to care for her as a person is Susie Monahan, one of the nurses on the staff.

Late in Vivian's illness, the only visitor she receives in the hospital is her former graduate school professor and mentor, Evelyn Ashford, who reads her excerpts from Margaret Wise Brown's The Runaway Bunny. Ashford observes that the story is "a little allegory of the soul. No matter where it hides. God will find it".

As she nears the end of her life, Vivian manages to maintain her dignity and wit even as she is finally confronted with her own frailty and need for compassion. Vivian dies at the end of the film, with her voiceover reciting "death be not proud".

== Cast ==
- Emma Thompson as Dr. Vivian Bearing, Ph.D.
- Audra McDonald as Susie Monahan, R.N.
- Jonathan M. Woodward as Dr. Jason Posner
- Christopher Lloyd as Dr. Harvey Kelekian
- Eileen Atkins as Dr. Evelyn Ashford, Ph.D.
- Harold Pinter as Mr. Bearing

== Production ==
In preparation for the role of Vivian Bearing, Emma Thompson shaved her head, following in the footsteps of actresses such as Kathleen Chalfant and Judith Light, who had performed the role on stage.

The film was shot at the Pinewood Studios in London.

The soundtrack includes a number of classical pieces, including the Serenade Adagio from Dmitri Shostakovich's String Quartet No. 15, Spiegel im Spiegel by Arvo Pärt, the second movement of Henryk Mikolaj Gorecki's Symphony No. 3 (Symphony of Sorrowful Songs), and The Unanswered Question by Charles Ives.

== Reception ==
=== Critical response ===
The film was received with general acclaim. On Rotten Tomatoes it has a score of 83% based on reviews from 12 critics.

Eddie Cockrell of Variety called the film "shrewd and triumphant" and "focused, emotionally draining and ultimately inspiring" and added, "The risks in filming such a theatrical experience are enormous, yet the original material has been carefully and smartly reworked for the screen by Thompson and Nichols ... Subtle yet crucial shifts from theatrical to film conventions abound, reaffirming Thompson's skill as both writer and actress ... as well as Nichols' proven track record with theatrical properties."

Caryn James of The New York Times observed, "Emma Thompson gives one of her most brilliant performances as Vivian Bearing...Mr. Nichols and Ms. Thompson, who wrote the script together, have made minimal changes to the play, but those amount to a major transformation. They have preserved Ms. Edson's language and intense focus on Vivian's hospital room as she endures eight months of brutal experimental chemotherapy for ovarian cancer. But Mr. Nichols's visual choices turn this into a fluent, gripping television film...The hospital staff around her is played beautifully by actors who escape the hazards of clichés. As Jason, a young doctor proud of the A minus he once got in Vivian's poetry course, Jonathan M. Woodward makes his character's callowness and insensitivity believable. As Susie, the nurse whose total compassion makes her Jason's opposite, Audra McDonald is especially impressive because the character could so easily have been treated with condescension...E. M. Ashford is played with unerring delicacy by Eileen Atkins in a performance that matches Ms. Thompson's brilliance.... [L]et's not pretend that Wit is fun or necessarily soothing; frankly, it is depressing. But if you miss this version, you will also miss a rare experience."

In his July 3, 2008 blog, Roger Ebert recalled naming Wit one of the year's best on his Best Films of 2001 program with Richard Roeper, even though it never opened theatrically. He described it as "both intelligent and heartbreaking" and called Emma Thompson's performance "her best work on film." He said when he tried to watch the DVD in later years, he discovered "I actually could not watch the movie. I remembered it too clearly, perhaps, and dreaded re-living it. When I reviewed it, its situation was theoretical for me, and I responded to the honesty and emotion of the drama. Since then, I have had cancer, and had all too many hours, days and weeks of hospital routine robbing me of my dignity. Although people in my situation are always praised for their courage, actually courage has nothing to do with it. There is no choice."

Critics from The A.V. Club, New York Magazine, Los Angeles Times, San Francisco Chronicle and The Wall Street Journal, among others, also praised the film and its performances. Nichols' direction was lauded in many reviews as well.

=== Accolades ===
Year	Award	Category	Nominee(s)	Result	Ref.
2001	Berlin International Film Festival	Golden Bear	Mike Nichols	Nominated	
2001	Berlin International Film Festival	Special Prize of the Ecumenical Jury	Mike Nichols	Won	
2001	Humanitas Prize	PBS/Cable Television	Emma Thompson and Mike Nichols	Won	
2001	National Board of Review Awards	Best Film Made for Cable TV		Won	
2001	Online Film & Television Association Awards	Best Motion Picture Made for Television		Won	
2001	Online Film & Television Association Awards	Best Actress in a Motion Picture or Miniseries	Emma Thompson	Nominated	
2001	Online Film & Television Association Awards	Best Supporting Actor in a Motion Picture or Miniseries	Christopher Lloyd	Nominated	
2001	Online Film & Television Association Awards	Best Supporting Actress in a Motion Picture or Miniseries	Audra McDonald	Nominated	
2001	Online Film & Television Association Awards	Best Direction of a Motion Picture or Miniseries		Nominated	
2001	Online Film & Television Association Awards	Best Writing of a Motion Picture or Miniseries		Won	
2001	Online Film & Television Association Awards	Best Ensemble in a Motion Picture or Miniseries		Nominated	
2001	Online Film & Television Association Awards	Best Editing in a Motion Picture or Miniseries		Nominated	
2001	Peabody Awards		Avenue Pictures in association with HBO Films	Won	
2001	Primetime Emmy Awards	Outstanding Made for Television Movie	Mike Nichols, Cary Brokaw, and Simon Bosanquet	Won	
2001	Primetime Emmy Awards	Outstanding Lead Actress in a Miniseries or a Movie	Emma Thompson	Nominated	
2001	Primetime Emmy Awards	Outstanding Supporting Actress in a Miniseries or a Movie	Audra McDonald	Nominated	
2001	Primetime Emmy Awards	Outstanding Directing for a Miniseries or a Movie	Mike Nichols	Won	
2001	Primetime Emmy Awards	Outstanding Writing for a Miniseries or a Movie	Emma Thompson and Mike Nichols	Nominated	
2001	Primetime Emmy Awards	Outstanding Casting for a Miniseries, Movie or a Special	Ellen Lewis, Juliet Taylor, and Leo Davis	Nominated	
2001	Primetime Emmy Awards	Outstanding Single-Camera Picture Editing for a Miniseries, Movie or a Special	John Bloom	Won	
2001	Television Critics Association Awards	Outstanding Achievement in Movies, Miniseries and Specials		Nominated	
2001	Valladolid International Film Festival	Golden Spike	Mike Nichols	Nominated	
2001	Valladolid International Film Festival	Best Actress	Emma Thompson	Won	
2002	Christopher Awards	Television & Cable	Mike Nichols, Emma Thompson, Simon Bosanquet, Julie Lynn, Charles F. Ryan, Michael Haley, and Cary Brokaw	Won	
2002	Critics' Choice Awards	Best Actress in a Picture Made for Television	Emma Thompson	Nominated	
2002	Golden Globe Awards	Best Miniseries or Motion Picture Made for Television		Nominated	
2002	Golden Globe Awards	Best Actress in a Miniseries or Motion Picture Made for Television	Emma Thompson	Nominated	
2002	Producers Guild of America Awards	David L. Wolper Award for Outstanding Producer of Long-Form Television	Mike Nichols, Cary Brokaw, and Simon Bosanquet	Nominated	
2002	Satellite Awards	Best Motion Picture Made for Television		Nominated	
2002	Satellite Awards	Best Actress in a Miniseries or a Motion Picture Made for Television	Emma Thompson	Nominated	
2002	Screen Actors Guild Awards	Outstanding Performance by a Female Actor in a Miniseries or Television Movie	Emma Thompson	Nominated	
2019	Online Film & Television Association Awards	Television Hall of Fame: Productions		Inducted	

== Home media ==
HBO Home Video released the film in 16:9 format on DVD on September 11, 2001.

== See also ==
- List of Primetime Emmy Awards received by HBO
