= List of Keele University people =

This is a list of notable people related to Keele University and its predecessor, the University College of North Staffordshire.

== Presidents and Chancellors ==
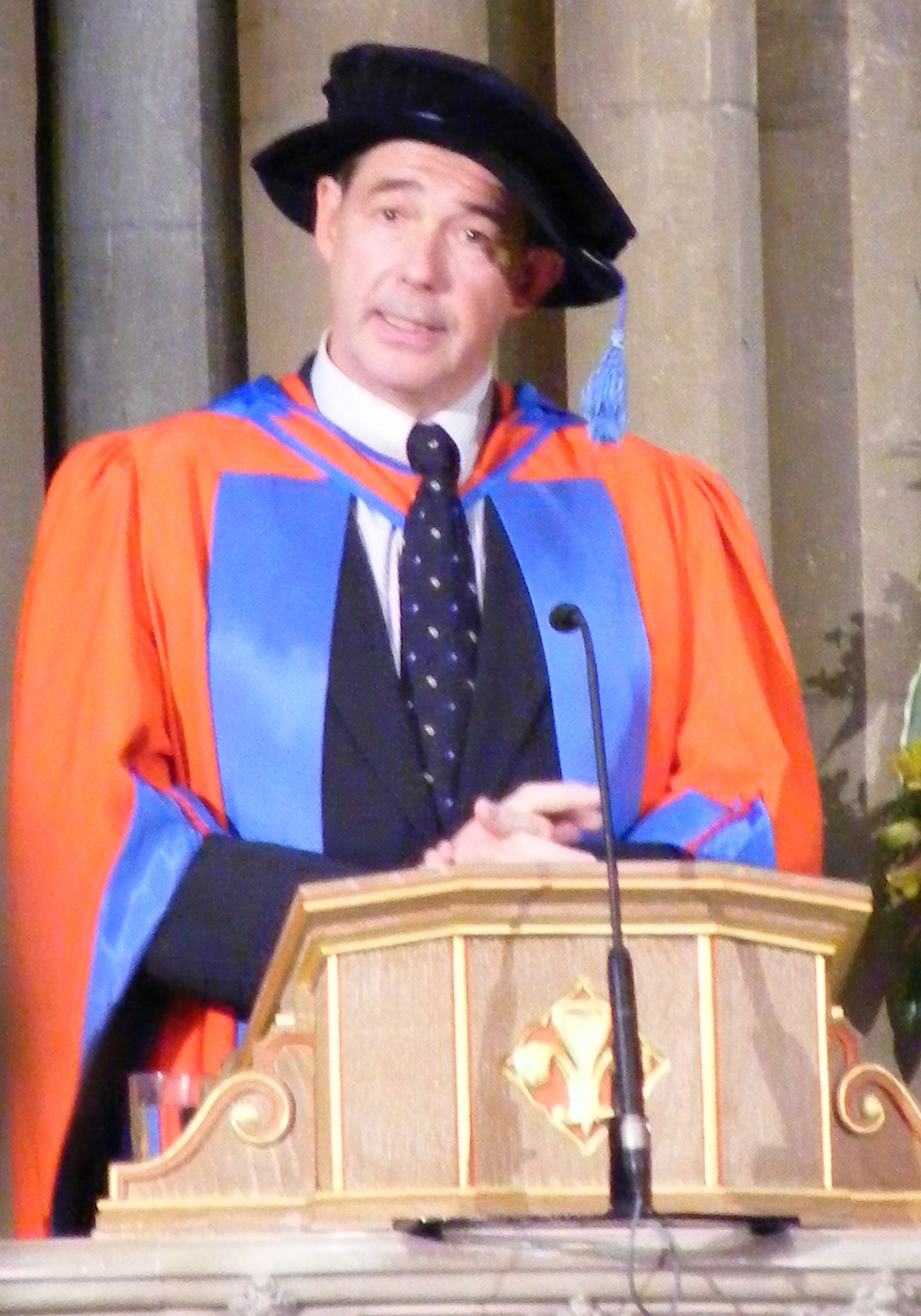
Sir Jonathon Porritt

The Chancellor of Keele University is the ceremonial head of Keele University. The position was originally the 'President of the University College of North Staffordshire', changing to the Chancellor when the institution became a full university in 1962.

- John Herbert Dudley Ryder, 5th Earl of Harrowby (1949–55)
- Princess Margaret, Countess of Snowdon (1956–86)
- Claus Moser, Baron Moser (1986–2002)
- Sir David Weatherall (2002–2012)
- Sir Jonathon Porritt (2012–2022)
- James Timpson, Baron Timpson (2022-2024)
- Carol Shanahan (2026–)

== Principals and Vice-Chancellors ==
- Alexander Dunlop Lindsay, 1st Baron Lindsay of Birker (1949–52)
- Sir John Lennard-Jones (1953–54)
- Sir George Barnes (1956–60)
- Harold McCarter Taylor (1961–67)
- W. A. Campbell Stewart (1967–79)
- Sir David Harrison (1979–84)
- Sir Brian Fender (1985–95)
- Dame Janet Finch (1995–2010)
- Nick Foskett (2010–2015)
- Trevor McMillan (2015–2025)
- Kevin Shakesheff (2025 - Present)

== Academics ==
- Tony Barrand – Professor Emeritus of Anthropology, Boston University
- Patricia Clavin - historian
- Jonathan Dollimore – English sociologist
- Richard English – historian
- Roy Fisher – American Studies lecturer and poet
- Mark Galeotti – historian and expert on modern Russia
- Jill Gibbon – graphic artist
- Oliver Harris – professor of American literature and expert in the works of William Burroughs
- Sir Nick Partridge – British health care specialist
- Dame Joan Kathleen Stringer – British political scientist

== Alumni ==
Academia and Science

- Eliathamby Ambikairajah – engineer
- Stan Beckensall – expert on prehistoric rock art
- Dame Sandra Dawson – organisational theorist
- Jonathan Dollimore – sociologist; cultural and literary theorist
- Richard English – political historian
- Charles Iain Hamilton – historian
- Pradeep Mathur – educationalist
- Des MacHale - Mathematics emeritus professor -University College Cork
- Sam Nolutshungu – political scientist
- David Richardson – Vice-Chancellor of the University of East Anglia
- Beverley Skeggs – sociologist
- Dame Joan Stringer – political scientist
- John Thompson – sociologist

Arts and Literature

- John Abram – composer
- Mark Ayres – musician, composer and audio engineer
- Tony Barrand – anthropologist and folk musician
- Francis Beckett – English author
- Carol Birch – English novelist
- Joe Beverley – English-Canadian writer
- Peter Child – composer
- Alys Clare – novelist
- Paul Darke – academic, artist and disability rights activist
- Jem Finer – founding member of The Pogues
- Janet Fitch – author
- Helen Sarah Thomas- British poet and writer
- Zulfikar Ghose – novelist, poet and essayist
- Jon Haylett – novelist
- Giles Hooper – author, lecturer and musicologist
- Liz Kessler – author
- Marina Lewycka – novelist
- Bernard Lloyd – actor
- Andy McDermott – British thriller author
- Marina Oliver – British romance novelist
- Keith Ovenden – English novelist and biographer
- Adrian Pang – Singaporean actor
- David Pownall – playwright and author
- Andy Quin – composer and jazz pianist
- Ken Rattenbury – musician
- Davide Rossi – musician, Goldfrapp; composer
- Antti Sakari Saario – composer, lecturer
- Peter Whelan – playwright

Diplomacy

- Emran bin Bahar – ambassador for Brunei Darussalam
- David Cooney – Irish ambassador to the UK
- Stephen Cutts – UN Assistant Secretary-General
- John Duncan – diplomat
- Peter Mond, 4th Baron Melchett – patron of Prisoners Abroad
- Jim Moran – EU ambassador
- Sir Richard Mottram – chairman of the Joint Intelligence Committee
- Dame Jo Williams – Chief Executive MENCAP
- Hso Khan Pha – Burmese prince also known as Tiger

Law

- Sir Peter Coulson – Lord Justice of Appeal, and Deputy Head of Civil Justice
- Michael Mansfield KC – human rights lawyer
- Malcolm Shaw – legal scholar
- John Taylor, Baron Taylor of Warwick – Member of the House of Lords and ex-Deputy District Judge
- Dame Fiona Woolf – Lord Mayor of London and ex-President of the Law Society

Politics

- Abd Dhiyab al-Ajili – Iraqi minister
- Judin Asar – Clerk of the Legislative Council of Brunei
- Jack Brereton – Conservative MP for Stoke-on-Trent South
- Phillida Bunkle – New Zealand MP
- Professor John Clancy – Former Leader, Birmingham City Council
- Paul Clark – MP for Gillingham from 1997 to 2010
- Ash Denham – MSP for Edinburgh Eastern in the Scottish Parliament
- Don Foster, Baron Foster of Bath – MP for Bath 1992 to 2015, Under-Secretary of State for Communities and Development 2012 to 2013
- John Golding – MP for Newcastle-under-Lyme from 1969 to 1986
- Eric Joyce – MP for Falkirk from 2000 to 2015
- Claire Kober – Labour Council leader for the London Borough of Haringey
- Alun Michael – ex-Labour MP for Cardiff South Penarth and Minister of State for Home Affairs
- Madeleine Moon – Labour MP for Bridgend
- Netumbo Nandi-Ndaitwah – Namibian politician
- Dame Priti Patel – Conservative MP for Witham in Essex and former Home Secretary
- Rosmawatty Abdul Mumin – Member of the Legislative Council of Brunei
- Clare Short – ex-Labour MP for Birmingham Ladywood and Secretary of State for International Development
- Gareth Snell - Labour MP for Stoke on Trent Central
- Adelaide Tambo – anti-apartheid activist South African MP
- Ian Taylor – MP for Esher from 1987 to 2010
- Sir John Vereker – ex-Permanent Secretary for International Development and Governor of Bermuda
- Lynda Waltho – Labour MP for Stourbridge
- Sufian Sabtu – Deputy Minister at the Prime Minister's Office of Brunei

TV and journalism

- Phil Avery – BBC weather presenter
- Tony Elliott, founder of Time Out
- Jack Emery, British director, writer and producer for stage, TV and radio
- Terry Milewski – Canadian broadcaster and journalist
- Gerry Northam – BBC investigative journalist
- AJ Odudu – television presenter

Other

- Kojo Annan – businessman; son of former UN Secretary-General Kofi Annan
- Maggie Atkinson – Children's Commissioner, England
- Yvette Baker – champion orienteer
- Stephen Benn, 3rd Viscount Stansgate – Director of Parliamentary Affairs, Society of Biology
- Nataliey Bitature- social entrepreneur, Forbes 30 Under 30 entrepreneur
- Robert Cooling – Assistant Chief of the Naval Staff
- David Edwards – second person to win Who Wants to be a Millionaire?
- Jonathan Gledhill – Bishop of Lichfield
- Steve Jackson – Game designer, co-founder of Games Workshop and Lionhead Studios
- Peter Moore – business executive
- Sir Nick Partridge – chief executive, Terence Higgins Trust
- Derek Tidball – theologian
- Sir Chris Woodhead – chief inspector of schools
