= John Llewellyn (academic) =

British chemist and academic administrator

Sir Frederick John Llewellyn KCMG FRSA FRIC FRSNZ FNZIC
- Born: 29 April 1915; Dursley, Gloucestershire, England
- Died: 15 November 1988 (aged 73); London, England
- Education: University of Birmingham (BSc, PhD, DSc)
- Spouses: Joyce Barrett (m. 1939)
- Children: 2
- Relatives: Don Llewellyn (brother)
- Scientific career
- Fields: Chemistry, X-ray crystallography
- Workplaces: Birkbeck, University of London; Ministry of Supply; Imperial Chemical Industries; University of Auckland
- Thesis: The crystalline structure of pentaerythritol and β-methyl-xyloside (1938)
- Academic advisors: Ernest Gordon Cox; Norman Haworth
- Doctoral students: David Hall; June Sutor; Neil Waters; Joyce Waters
- Other notable students: Charmian O'Connor

Vice-chancellor of University of Exeter
- In office 1966–1972
- Preceded by: James Wilfred Cook
- Succeeded by: Harry Kay

Vice-chancellor and rector of University of Canterbury
- In office 1956–1961
- Preceded by: Henry Rainsford Hulme (as rector of Canterbury University College)
- Succeeded by: Leslie Pownall

Sir Frederick John Llewellyn KCMG FRSA FRIC FRSNZ FNZIC (29 April 1915 – 15 November 1988), known as John or Jack Llewellyn, was an English chemist and academic administrator who spent some of his career in New Zealand.

== Early life and education ==
Llewellyn was born in 1915 in Dursley, Gloucestershire. He received his education at Dursley Grammar School. He attended the University of Birmingham, from where he graduated with a BSc (1st class honours) in Chemistry. He remained at Birmingham for his PhD, where he was introduced to the field of X-ray crystallography by professor Ernest Gordon Cox and worked alongside Nobel laureate Norman Haworth. His thesis, submitted in 1938, was titled, The crystalline structure of pentaerythritol and β-methyl-xyloside.

== Career ==
=== 1938 - 1947: Early career in the UK ===
After his PhD at Birmingham, Llewellyn worked as Scientific Officer at the Fuel Research Station in Greenwich from 1938 to 1939. He lectured at Birkbeck College in London in chemistry from 1939 to 1945. From 1941 to 1946, he researched explosives for the Ministry of Supply. This experience at the Ministry of Supply would later inspire his research interest in organic nitrogenous compounds. Llewellyn returned to Birmingham, his alma mater, for a research fellowship with Imperial Chemical Industries (ICI) from 1946 to 1947.

=== 1947 - 1965: New Zealand ===
In 1947, Llewellyn moved to New Zealand to take up the position of Professor and head of the Chemistry department at University of Auckland. There, he was credited as an early pioneer in the field of X-ray crystallography in New Zealand. Among his students at Auckland were the then undergraduate student Charmian O'Connor (later Dame Charmian), as well as doctoral researchers David Hall, June Sutor, Joyce Waters, and Neil Waters - future vice-chancellor of Massey University.

From 1956 to 1961, he was at the University of Canterbury to become their first Vice-Chancellor and rector. During his tenure at Canterbury, Llewellyn oversaw its transition from a constituent of the University of New Zealand to an independent institution with its own degree-awarding power. In 1961, he left Canterbury to be the first chairman of New Zealand's University Grants Committee, holding this position until 1966. During his tenure, Llewellyn was described by Rufus Rogers, who had been one of the campaigners for the creation of a university in Hamilton, as "a singularly impressive man". Rogers also named the chairman as one of the key individuals whose contribution led to the eventual creation of University of Waikato in 1964.

From 1962 to 1965, Llewellyn was chairman of the New Zealand Broadcasting Corporation, his first position outside academia.

=== Return to the UK ===
Llewellyn returned to the UK to become the Vice-Chancellor of the University of Exeter in 1966. During his tenure, the university saw growing student numbers and with that, constructions of new campus buildings and halls of residence. Some of the buildings opened during this time at Exeter were the Newman, Laver, and Streatham Court, as well as Northcott Theatre, the first on-campus arts centre to be built at a UK university.

Some of the buildings constructed during Llewellyn's tenure at Exeter

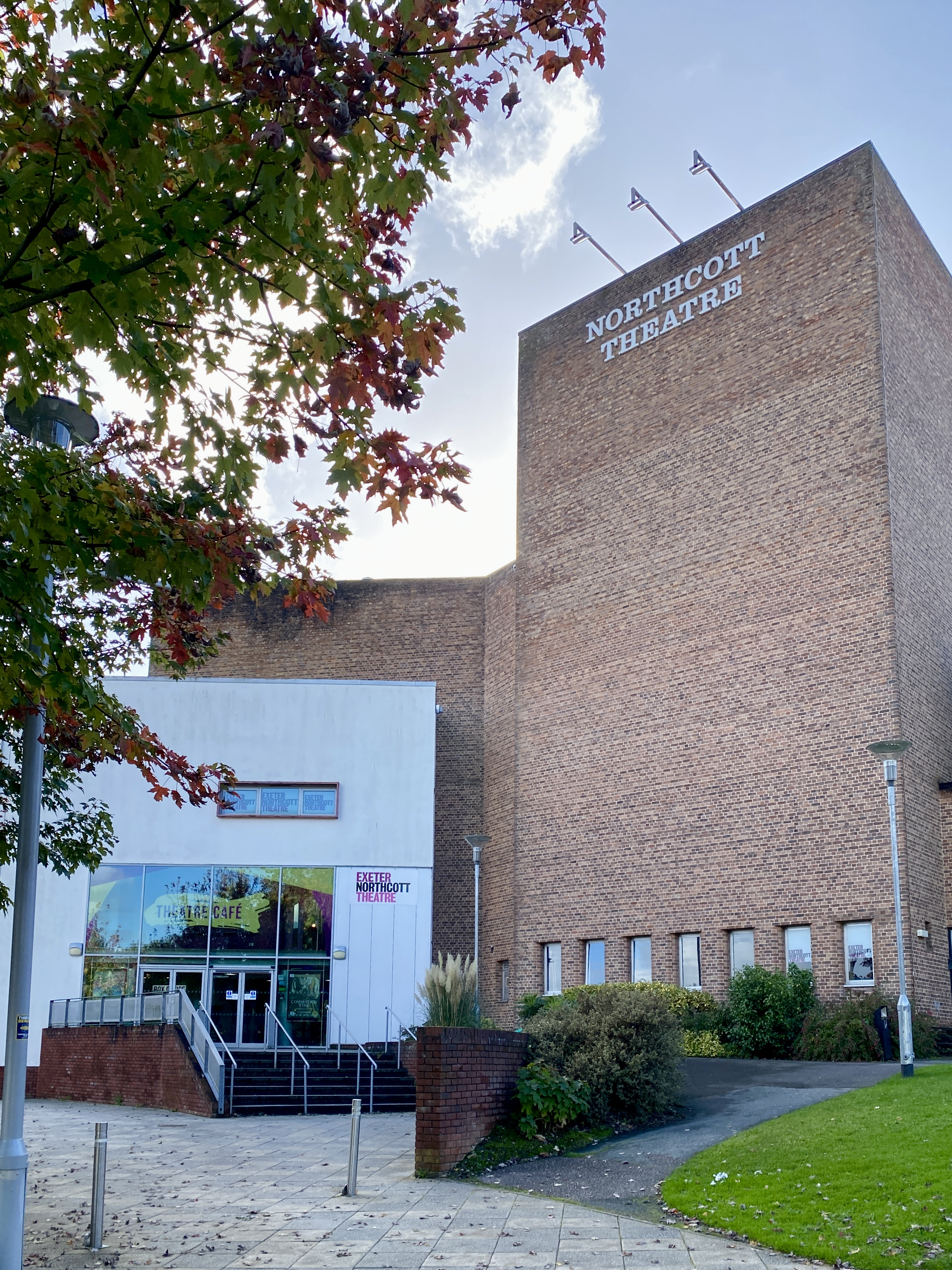
Northcott Theatre

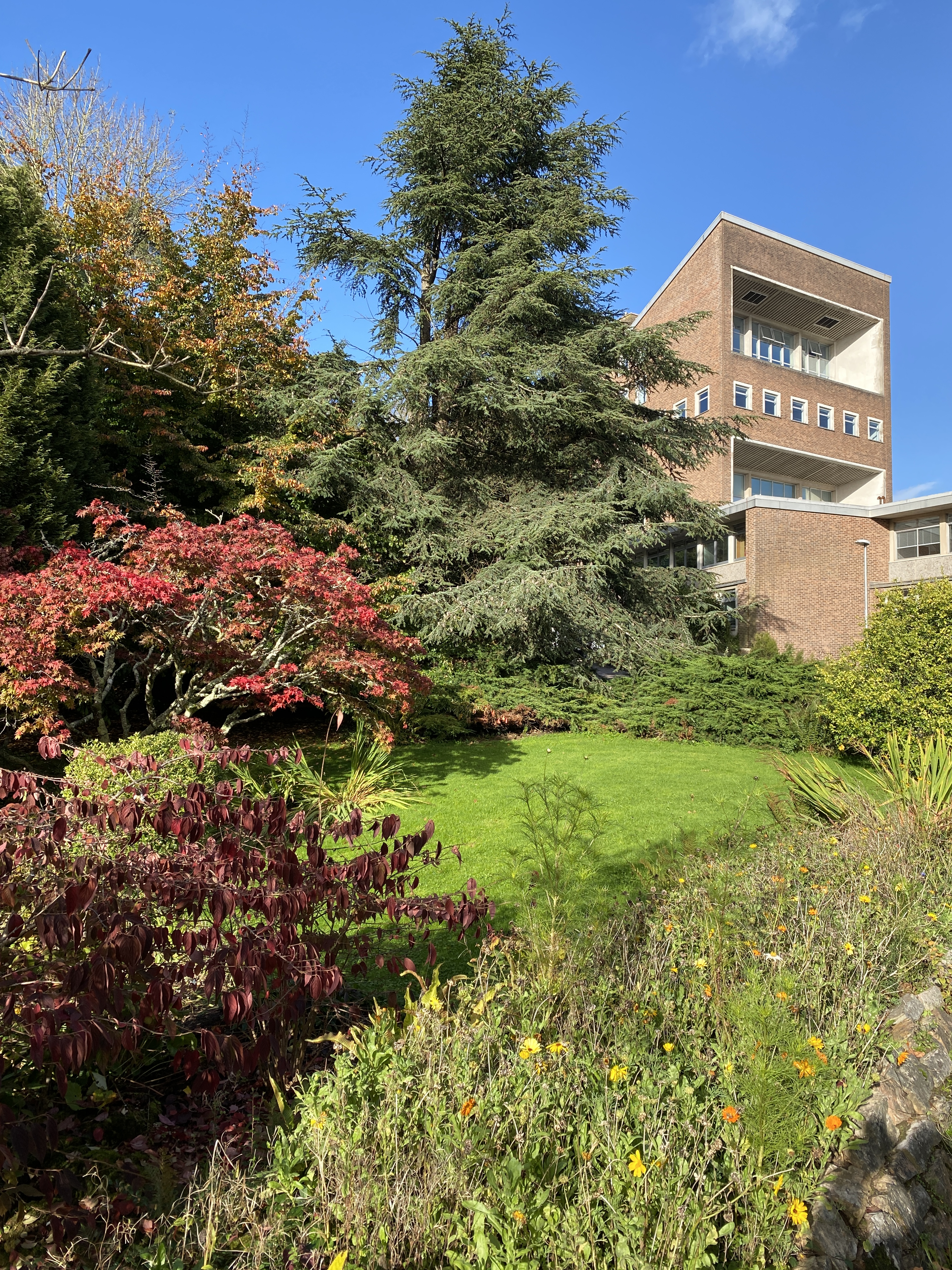
Laver Building

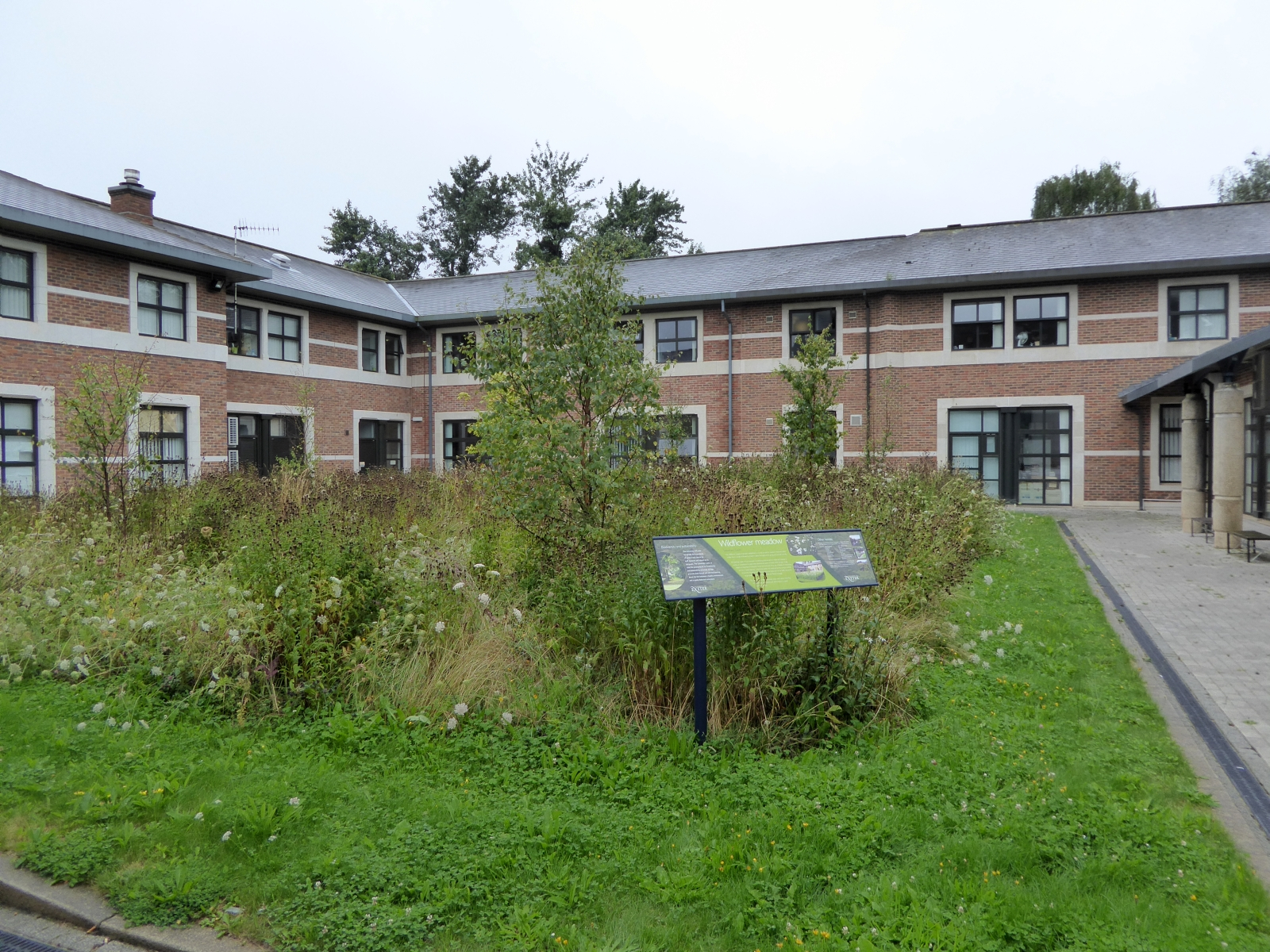
Streatham Court

Llewellyn left Exeter in 1972 to become Director General of the British Council, holding this office until 1980. He was appointed at a time of crisis for the organisation, when it was at risk of being closed down by the government. Llewellyn's directorship was credited with bringing British Council, "from the position of a financial burden to one of profit".

== Honours and recognition ==
Llewellyn became a fellow of the Chemical Society in the UK in 1937 and was also a fellow of the New Zealand Institute of Chemistry. In 1952, he was elected as fellow of the Royal Society of Arts, serving as the inaugural chairman of the society’s South West regional branch in 1966. He was elected as fellow of the Royal Society of New Zealand in 1964.

Llewellyn received a DSc from the University of Birmingham in 1951, on the basis of 17 publications on "electrostatics and X-ray crystal structure determination". In 1962, he was one of the three inaugural recipients of an honorary doctorate from the University of Canterbury, receiving a Legum Doctor (LLD). In 1966, Victoria University of Wellington conferred the same honorary degree on him. He also received honorary degrees from Universities of Exeter and Salford and the Open University in 1973, 1975, and 1979, respectively.

In the 1974 Birthday Honours, Llewellyn was appointed a Knight Commander of the Order of St Michael and St George (KCMG).

== Personal life and death ==
In 1939, he married Joyce Barrett; they were to have one son and one daughter. His younger brother, Sir Don Llewellyn (1919–2004), was also a chemist and was the founding Vice-chancellor of University of Waikato. A photography enthusiast according to The International Who's Who, Llewellyn was a patron of the Photographic Society at Auckland University College during his time at the institution.

Llewellyn died at his home in London on 15 November 1988, aged 73.

== See also ==
- List of honorary doctors of the University of Canterbury
- List of honorary doctors of Victoria University of Wellington
- List of University of Exeter people

Academic offices
Preceded by unknown	Vice-Chancellor of the University of Canterbury, New Zealand	Succeeded by unknown
Preceded by James Cook	Vice-Chancellor of the University of Exeter; 1966–1972	Succeeded by Harry Kay
