= Don Llewellyn =

British–New Zealand chemist and university administrator (1919-2004)

Sir Don Llewellyn KNZM CBE JP FRSC
- Born: Donald Rees Llewellyn; 20 November 1919; Dursley, Gloucestershire, England
- Died: 4 August 2004 (aged 84); Hamilton, New Zealand
- Education: University of Oxford
- Board member of: National Agricultural Fieldays
- Spouse: Ruth Blandford (m. 1943; died 1997)
- Children: 2
- Relatives: John Llewellyn (brother)
- Awards: Thomson Medal (1994)
- Scientific career
- Fields: Physical chemistry
- Workplaces: Clarendon Laboratory; Cavendish Laboratory; University College of North Wales; University College London; University of Auckland
- Thesis: Certain connections between physical properties and chemical constitution (1943)
- Academic advisors: Norman Haworth; Francis Simon

1st Vice-chancellor of the University of Waikato
- In office 1964–1984
- Succeeded by: Wilf Malcolm

President of the New Zealand Institute of Chemistry
- In office 1968
- Preceded by: Max Carrie
- Succeeded by: John Vaughan
- In office 1988
- Preceded by: Terry Hitchings
- Succeeded by: Joyce Waters

Sir Donald Rees Llewellyn KNZM CBE JP FRSC (20 November 1919 – 4 August 2004) was a British chemist and academic who later migrated to New Zealand. He was the founding vice-chancellor of the University of Waikato, established in 1964.

== Early life and education ==
Llewellyn was raised in Dursley, Gloucestershire, England, where he was bon on 20 November 1919. He was the second son of Mabel Gertrude and Reginald George Llewellyn. His elder brother was Frederick John Llewellyn (1915–1988), who was also a chemist and academic. Llewellyn was educated at Dursley Grammar School, followed by the University of Birmingham, where he earned a Bachelor of Science degree with first-class honours in chemistry in 1941.

In 1943, Llewellyn married Ruth Marian Blandford, with whom he had gone to school in Dursley, and the couple went on to have two children.

== Career ==
=== United Kingdom ===
In 1941, before finishing his BSc, Llewellyn began working as an assistant to Nobel laureate Norman Haworth, Birmingham's head of chemistry at the time, on the Tube Alloys project. From 1941 to 1944, he worked for the government's atomic energy project at the Clarendon Laboratory under the directorship of Francis Simon. Though he could not publish this work at the time, it earned him a DPhil from the University of Oxford. From 1944 to 1946, Llewellyn worked as a research assistant at the Cavendish Laboratory at Cambridge. His work there involved the production of stable isotopes for tracer studies through fractional distillation of water and other compounds.

Leaving Cambridge, Llewellyn went on to become a lecturer at University College of North Wales in Bangor, whose chemistry department was headed by Edward David Hughes. During this time, he also played football for Bangor City FC. From 1949 to 1952, he held a research fellowship with Imperial Chemical Industries (ICI) at University College London, where he later worked as a lecturer 1952 to 1956.

In 1957, the University of Birmingham awarded Llewellyn a Doctor of Science degree on the basis of his publications on the isotopes of oxygen.

=== New Zealand ===
In 1957, Llewellyn was appointed professor and director of the chemical laboratories at the University of Auckland, where his brother had previously worked, and he migrated to New Zealand with his wife and two children. He was credited with contributing to the development of the Urey Radiochemical Laboratory at Auckland, New Zealand's first nuclear physics laboratory. He also served as deputy vice-chancellor at Auckland between 1962 and 1964.

In 1964, Llewellyn was appointed inaugural vice-chancellor of the University of Waikato, a position that he held until his retirement in 1985. During his tenure, Llewellyn oversaw the establishment of Waikato's School of Sciences in 1968, built with funding from the University Grants Committee. He was also credited with fostering relationships between the university and research establishments in the region, local businesses, and the Māori community. However, Llewellyn and his administration were criticised for his handling of the case of Asmat Begum, a Bangladeshi master's student who had been blocked from completing her course in 1978 after being ordered to leave the country by the Department of Immigration. Despite appeals from academics and students on campus, Begum was denied the option of completing her degree remotely from her home country. A correspondent of the Australian newspaper Tribune cited the case as one of many examples that highlighted systemic racism in New Zealand society at the time, likening the issue to apartheid in South Africa.

Llewellyn was an active member of the New Zealand Institute of Chemistry, and twice served as the institute's president, in 1968 and 1988.

=== National Agricultural Fieldays ===
Llewellyn was a co-founder of the New Zealand National Fieldays Society and its flagship event, the National Agricultural Fieldays, an agricultural fair that has been held annually at Mystery Creek since 1969. As vice-chancellor of Waikato, Llewellyn had intended for the initiative to create a stronger relationship between the newly founded university and the Agricultural Research Institute at nearby Ruakura, as well as the wider farming community. He served as a board member of the Fieldays Society and was twice its president. His credibility and contacts were instrumental to the success of the annual event. Today, the annual Fieldays is considered the largest agricultural show in the Southern Hemisphere, attracting upwards of 100,000 attendees each year.

Llewellyn continued to support Fieldays long after his retirement from the university. Speaking to The New Zealand Herald about the 2003 event, he said, "The spirit of Fieldays is something you have to see to believe. [...] Everybody is so enthusiastic. That's why it's so successful."

== Later life and legacy ==
In retirement, Llewellyn and his wife lived in Hamilton. In 1991, he was appointed a justice of the peace.

Llewellyn's wife, Ruth Llewellyn, died in 1997. He died in Hamilton on 4 August 2004, at the age of 84.

The University of Waikato named its sports facilities complex, built in the 1990s, the Don Llewellyn Sports Pavilion, after the inaugural vice-chancellor. Llewellyn is also the namesake of the Llewellyn Lounge at the Mystery Creek Events Centre, which hosts the annual National Fieldays. In 2012, the New Zealand National Fieldays Society launched the Sir Don Llewellyn scholarship, awarded to postgraduate students at the University of Waikato with a focus on agriculture-related research.

== Honours and awards ==
In 1977, Llewellyn was awarded the Queen Elizabeth II Silver Jubilee Medal, and in 1990 he received the New Zealand 1990 Commemoration Medal. Upon his retirement in 1985, he had an honorary doctorate conferred upon him by the University of Waikato. The same year, he was elected an honorary fellow of the New Zealand Institute of Chemistry, and he received the award of Freedom Holder of the City of Hamilton. Llewellyn received the Thomson Medal from the Royal Society of New Zealand in 1994, awarded for "his outstanding contributions in the field of the organisation, administration and application of science". He was also a fellow and life member of the Royal Society of Chemistry.

Llewellyn was appointed a Commander of the Order of British Empire, for services to education and the community, in the 1992 New Year Honours. He was made a Knight Companion of the New Zealand Order of Merit in the 1999 New Year Honours, for services to agriculture and the community.
