= Samuel T. Cohen =

American physicist (1921–2010)

- Samuel T. Cohen, 1982 photo
- Born: January 25, 1921; Brooklyn, New York City
- Died: November 28, 2010 (aged 89); Los Angeles, California, US
- Education: University of California, Los Angeles
- Scientific career
- Fields: Nuclear weapons, Nuclear strategy
- Workplaces: RAND corporation

Samuel Theodore Cohen (January 25, 1921 – November 28, 2010) was an American physicist who is generally credited as the father of the neutron bomb.

== Biography ==
Cohen's parents were Austrian Jews who emigrated from London, England. He was born on January 25, 1921, in Brooklyn and raised in New York City. He studied mathematics and physics at University of California, Los Angeles before joining the United States Army after the Japanese attack on Pearl Harbor.

=== Manhattan Project ===
In 1944 he worked on the Manhattan Project in the efficiency group at Los Alamos and calculated how neutrons behaved in Fat Man, the atomic bomb that was later detonated over Nagasaki, Japan.

=== RAND Corporation ===
After the war he studied for his Ph.D. at Berkeley before dropping out to join the RAND Corporation. At RAND Corporation in 1950, his work on the intensity of fallout radiation first became public when his calculations were included as a special appendix in Samuel Glasstone's book The Effects of Atomic Weapons. Cohen was personally responsible for recruiting the famous strategist Herman Kahn into the RAND Corporation.

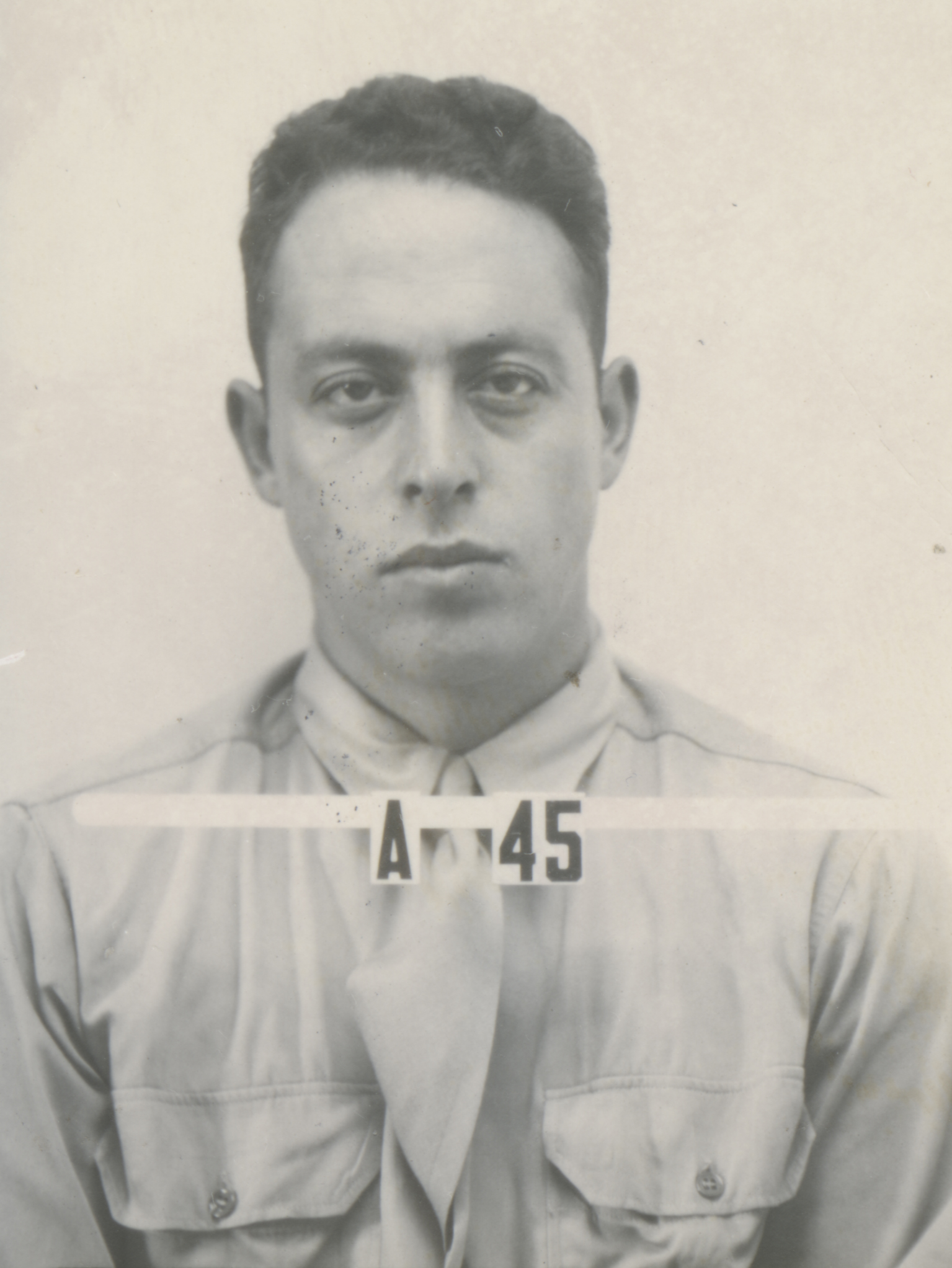
Cohen's Los Alamos badge photo

=== "Clean" nuclear tests ===
In 1956, President Dwight D. Eisenhower announced the testing of a 95% "clean" (2-stage) fusion weapon, later identified to have been the July 11 Navajo test at Bikini Atoll during Operation Redwing. This weapon had a yield of 4.5 megatons. Previous "dirty" weapons had fission proportions of 50–77%, due to the use of uranium-238 as a "pusher" around the lithium deuteride (secondary) stage. This is deliberate; the fusion reactions give off large quantities of 14.1 MeV neutrons, which have more energy than the 1.1 MeV "fission threshold" for U-238. This means the neutrons, which would otherwise escape, create fission reactions in the neutron reflecting 'tamper', increasing the overall yield of the weapon essentially "for free".

The 1956 "clean" tests used a lead pusher, while in 1958 a tungsten carbide pusher was employed. Hans A. Bethe supported clean nuclear weapons in 1958 as chairman of a presidential science advisory group on nuclear testing:

... certain hard targets require ground bursts, such as airfield runways if it is desired to make a crater, railroad yards if severe destruction of tracks is to be accomplished ... The use of clean weapons in strategic situations may be indicated in order to protect the local population.
– Dr. Hans Bethe, Working Group Chairman, 27 March 1958 "Top Secret – Restricted Data" Report to the NSC Ad Hoc Working Group on the Technical Feasibility of a Cessation of Nuclear Testing, p 9.

In consequence of Bethe's recommendations, on July 12, 1958, the Hardtack-Poplar shot of the Mk-41C warhead was carried out on a barge in the lagoon yielded 9.3 megatons, of which only 4.8% was fission, and thus 95.2% "clean".

In 1958, Cohen investigated a low-yield "clean" nuclear weapon and discovered that the "clean" bomb case thickness scales as the cube root of yield. So a larger percentage of neutrons escapes from a small detonation, due to the thinner case required to reflect back X-rays during the secondary stage (fusion) ignition. For example, a 1-kiloton bomb only needs a case one-tenth the thickness of that required for 1-megaton.

So, although most neutrons are absorbed by the casing in a 1-megaton bomb, in a 1-kiloton bomb they would mostly escape. A neutron bomb is only feasible if the yield is sufficiently high that efficient fusion stage ignition is possible, and if the yield is low enough that the case thickness will not absorb too many neutrons. This means that neutron bombs have a yield range of 1–10 kilotons, with fission proportion varying from 50% at 1-kiloton to 25% at 10-kilotons (all of which comes from the primary stage). The neutron output per kiloton is then 10–15 times greater than for a pure fission implosion weapon or for a strategic warhead like a W87 or W88.

=== Vietnam War proposals ===
During the Vietnam War, Cohen argued that using small neutron bombs would end the war quickly and save many American lives, but politicians were not amenable to his ideas and other scientists ignored the neutron bomb in reviewing the role of nuclear weapons. He was a member of the Los Alamos Tactical Nuclear Weapons Panel in the early 1970s. President Carter delayed development of the neutron bomb in 1978, but during Ronald Reagan's presidency, Cohen claims to have convinced Reagan to make 700 neutron bombs, 350 shells to go into the 8 inch (203-millimeter) howitzer and 350 W70 Mod. 3 warheads for the Lance missile.

=== U.S. Department of Defense manual on the neutron bomb ===
Cohen's neutron bomb is not mentioned in the unclassified manual by Glasstone and Dolan, The Effects of Nuclear Weapons 1957–1977, but is included as an "enhanced neutron weapon" in chapter 5 of the declassified (formerly secret) manual edited by Philip J. Dolan, Capabilities of Nuclear Weapons, U.S. Department of Defense, effects manual DNA-EM-1, updated 1981 (U.S. Freedom of Information Act).

Under most atmospheric conditions no fallout effects would occur from the use of a neutron bomb, according to that manual, as the combination of 500-meter burst altitude and low yield prevents fallout in addition to significant thermal and blast effects. The reduction in damage outside the target area is a major advantage of such a weapon to deter massed tank invasions. An aggressor would thus be forced to disperse tanks, which would make them easier to destroy by simple hand-held anti-tank missile launchers.

Cohen's backing of investigations into these controversial ideas won him some media attention after many years of being ignored. In 1992 he was featured in the award-winning BBC TV series Pandora's Box, episode "To the Brink of Eternity", discussing his battles with officialdom and colleagues at the RAND Corporation. Cohen controversially argued: "When we started this systems analysis business, we stepped through the looking glass where people did the weirdest things and (used) the most perverse kind of logic imaginable and yet claimed to have the most precise understanding of everything."

== Alleged support from the Pope for low-yield tactical nuclear bombs ==
Cohen reportedly worked in France on low-yield, highly discriminate tactical nuclear weapons in 1979–80. He claimed that he was awarded a medal by Pope John Paul II in 1979 for his bid to reform modern warfare. Author Charles Platt reported in a 2005 profile of Sam Cohen that "... he showed me the Medal of Peace that he had received from the Pope in 1979."

At the time, Warsaw Pact forces had a massive tank superiority in Europe (though NATO maintained an overall strategic superiority); the Christian Science Monitor reported in 1981 that there were "19,500 tanks in the Soviet-controlled forces of the Warsaw Pact aimed at Western Europe. Of these, 12,500 are Soviet tanks in Soviet units. NATO has 7,000 tanks on its side facing the 19,500." A deterrent which was designed to minimise civilian casualties was a step away from the risk of indiscriminate warfare. The neutron bomb's killing by neutron radiation is different from the fallout of a normal high yield thermonuclear weapon because it can be controlled more precisely, restricted to military targets and kept away from civilians.

The speed of modern warfare meant that the civilian population would be unlikely to be able to withdraw from combat zones and would suffer a large number of deaths in a nuclear war where the blast yields and fallout were significant. Because neutron bombs do not produce the indiscriminate blast (only 40 kilopascals at ground zero from a 1 kt blast yield detonation at 500 m altitude, and only 7 kPa at 2 km distance), heat, and fallout damage of other nuclear weapons, they were more credible as a deterrent to Soviet tanks. However, many people believed that the very deployment of the neutron bomb threatened an escalation to full-scale nuclear retaliation, thus canceling out the supposed benefits. Advances in precision anti-tank weapons ultimately made the neutron bomb redundant tactically in its original objective. The debate over "clean" low yield nuclear weapons continue with earth penetrator technology ("nuclear bunker busters").

=== Red Mercury claims ===
More recently, Cohen was the main proponent of what most consider to be a mythical substance, red mercury. If the "conventional story" is to be believed, red mercury was a disinformation campaign led by US government agencies in order to lure potential terrorists into being captured. The story that was released was that red mercury was developed by the Soviet Union as a "shortcut" to a fusion bomb, and that with the fall of the Soviet Union it was being offered on the market by the Soviet mafia. When prospective buyers showed up to take delivery of the material, they were arrested.

During the height of the story, in the 1990s, Cohen became a proponent of red mercury. He claimed not only that it existed, but that he knew its nature; it was a powerful ballotechnic material that directly compressed the fusion fuel without the need for a fission primary. Bombs using red mercury had no real critical mass and could be developed at any size. He further claimed that the Soviets had produced a number of "micro-nukes" based on red mercury, which are described as being about as large as a baseball and weighing 10 pounds. According to Cohen, their existence meant that any effort to control nuclear proliferation based on fissile material was thus hopeless. A reiteration of the claim can be seen in The Nuclear Threat That Doesn't Exist – or Does It or No?, by Cohen and Joe Douglass in a March 11, 2003, guest editorial in Financial Sense Online.

=== Political involvement ===
In 1984, in a cover story for the libertarian magazine Reason, Cohen expressed support for the construction of a nuclear-radiation field along the borders of Israel as a means of protecting it from the military forces of other nations and killing anyone who approached it via gamma radiation. "What I am suggesting is the construction of a border barrier whose most effective component is an extremely intense field of nuclear radiation (produced by the operation of underground nuclear reactors), sharply confined to the barrier zone, which practically guarantees the death of anyone attempting to breach the barrier," he wrote. "Establishing such a 'nuclear wall' at the borders of a threatened country can make virtually impossible any successful penetration by ground forces – as well as a preemptive ground attack by the threatened country."

Cohen spoke at an April 2000 fundraiser in La Canada, California, for then-Reform Party presidential candidate Patrick Buchanan. Irv Rubin was prominently present at this event, with his organization, the Jewish Defense League (JDL), and with members of the Libertarian Party, to protest. The JDL posted Cohen's home phone number and address on its website, urging its members to contact him, to persuade him to stop supporting Buchanan.

In her address to the 2000 Reform Party National Convention, Buchanan's running mate, Ezola Foster, cited Cohen's endorsement of Buchanan to refute the claim that the candidate was anti-Semitic.

== Support for Baptist pastor and author William P. Grady ==
As part of a self-described unusual friendship, Cohen wrote the afterword to William P. Grady's 2005 bestseller titled How Satan Turned America Against God. Cohen explained that although he was an unbelieving Jew, and thus could not relate to the spiritual content of the book, he concurred with Grady's grasp of America's disastrous foreign policy.

== Death ==
He died on November 28, 2010, in Brentwood, Los Angeles, from complications of his stomach cancer.

== In popular culture ==
On the DVD of the film Repo Man (which contains a fictional character loosely based on Cohen and the neutron bomb as a plot device), Cohen is interviewed in the commentary on the deleted scenes. During the interview, Cohen asserts that the neutron bomb conforms to just war theories.

The Neutron Bomb documentary film by Peter Kuran (released in 2022) was partly based on a prior interview with Cohen.
