= IKT =

IKT may refer to:

- Institute of Knowledge Transfer, a British professional organisation
- International Airport Irkutsk, Russia
- Inuvialuktun, an Inuit language of Canada
