= Ted Baker (chemist) =

New Zealand academic and chemist

Ted Baker CNZM
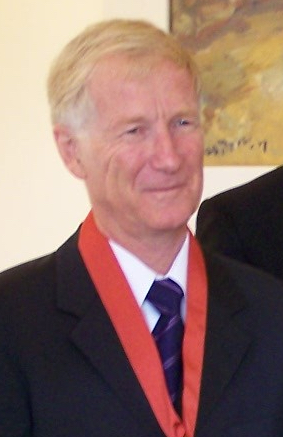
- Baker in 2008
- Born: Edward Neill Baker; 29 October 1942 (age 83); Stanley, Falkland Islands
- Education: University of Auckland
- Awards: Hector Medal (1997); Rutherford Medal (2006)
- Scientific career
- Fields: Structural biology; protein crystallography
- Institutions: University of Oxford; Massey University; University of Auckland
- Thesis: Structural studies of some copper(II) coordination compounds (1967)
- Doctoral advisor: Neil Waters; David Hall
- Doctoral students: Tamir Gonen

Edward Neill Baker CNZM (born 29 October 1942) is a New Zealand scientist specialising in protein purification and crystallization and bioinformatics. He is currently a distinguished professor at the University of Auckland.

== Biography ==
Born at Port Stanley in 1942 to New Zealanders Harold and Moya (née Boak) Baker, he spent his early life in the Falkland Islands, where his father was the superintendent of education. The family returned to New Zealand in 1948. He was educated at King's College, Auckland from 1956 to 1960. After studying chemistry at the University of Auckland, completing his PhD in 1967, he conducted postdoctoral research on the structure of insulin with Nobel laureate Dorothy Hodgkin at the University of Oxford. He then took up an academic post at Massey University, where he determined the structure of the kiwifruit enzyme actinidin. In 1997 he moved back to the University of Auckland where he became professor of structural biology and later direct of the Maurice Wilkins Center for Molecular Diversity. He also served as president of the International Union of Crystallography between 1996 and 1999.

Baker was elected a Fellow of the Royal Society of New Zealand in 1987, and won the society's Hector Medal in 1997. He was awarded the Rutherford Medal, the highest honour in New Zealand science, in 2006. In the 2007 Queen's Birthday Honours, he was appointed a Companion of the New Zealand Order of Merit, for services to science.
