= Sarah Masters =

Physical chemistry lecturer

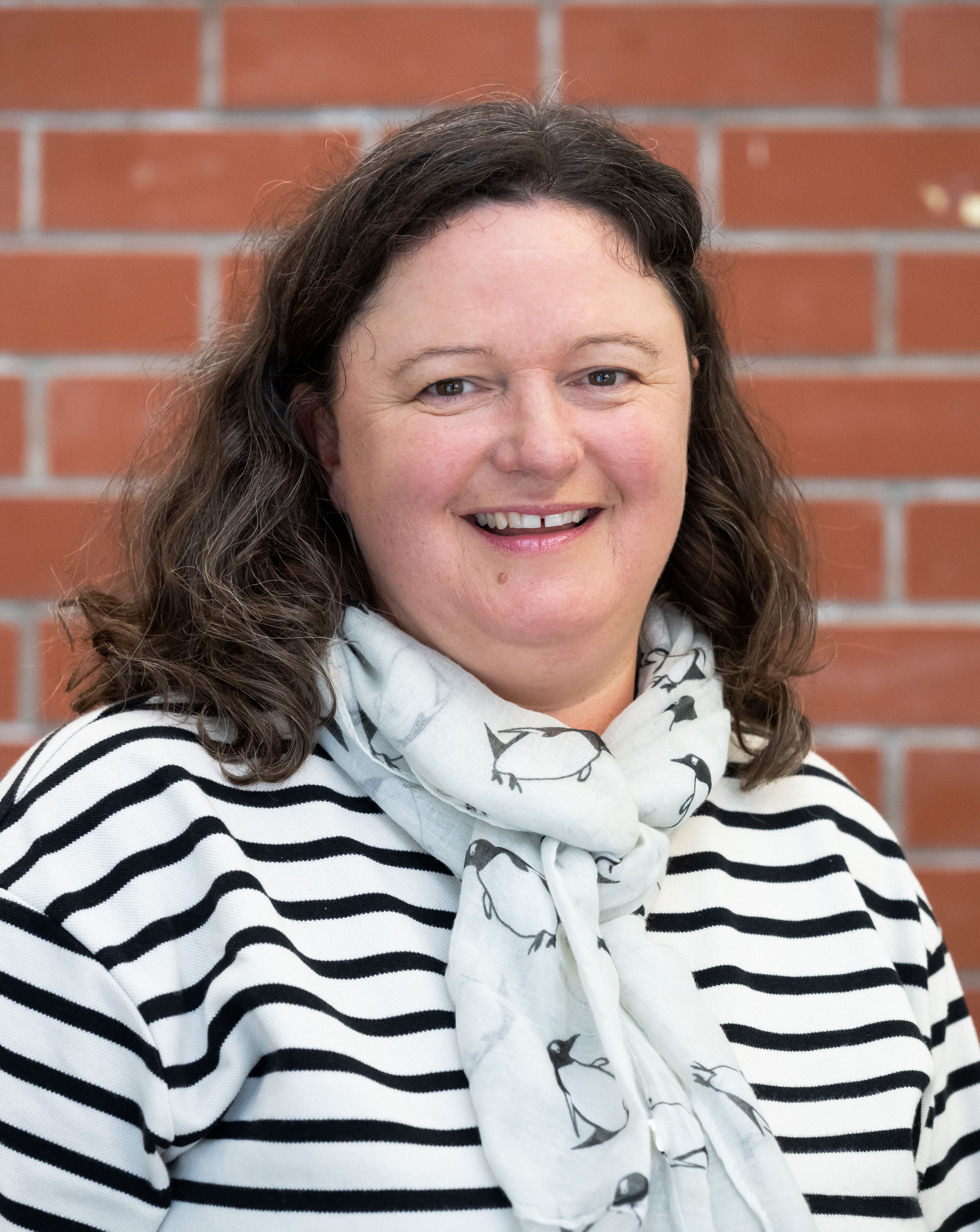
- Masters in 2026
- Born: Sarah Louise Hinchley
- Education: University of Edinburgh
- Scientific career
- Fields: Chemistry
- Workplaces: University of Canterbury
- Thesis: Static and Dynamic Effects of Sterically Demanding Ligands (2000)
- Doctoral advisor: David Rankin
- Website: University of Canterbury profile

Sarah Louise Masters (née Hinchley) is a Scottish–New Zealand academic, and is a Professor of Physical Chemistry at the University of Canterbury, specialising in researching structural information about transient species. She previously worked at the University of Edinburgh. She is a past president of the New Zealand Institute of Chemistry, and is a Fellow of that society and the Royal Society of Chemistry. She is President of Commonwealth Chemistry and leads the executive council of the journal Physical Chemistry Chemical Physics.

== Academic career ==
Masters grew up in southwest Scotland. She completed a PhD titled Static and Dynamic Effects of Sterically Demanding Ligands at the University of Edinburgh. She was Royal Society of Edinburgh BP Research Fellow at the University of Edinburgh. Masters then moved to the School of Physical and Chemical Sciences at the University of Canterbury in 2011, rising to full professor in 2023. She is an associate investigator of the McDiarmid Institute for Advanced Materials and Nanotechnology. Masters' research focuses on the design of materials for storage and transport of clean energy.

She has also been President of the New Zealand Institute of Chemistry. In 2019 she led events around the country to commemorate the 150th anniversary of Mendeleev's periodic table.

Masters is a member of the executive board of Commonwealth Chemistry, which is an international federation of chemical science societies, and was elected president in 2026. She is Chair of the executive council for the journal Physical Chemistry Chemical Physics.

== Honours and awards ==
Masters was awarded a teaching award at the University of Canterbury in 2021. Masters is a Fellow of the Royal Society of Chemistry and a Fellow of the New Zealand Institute of Chemistry.

== Selected works ==
- Masters, Sarah L.; Morrison, Carole; Rankin, David; et al. (2001). "Spontaneous generation of stable pnictinyl radicals from "jack-in-the-box" dipnictines: a solid-state, gas-phase, and theoretical investigation of the origins of steric stabilization". Journal of the American Chemical Society. 123 (37): 9045–9053. doi:10.1021/ja010615b. PMID 11552812. Wikidata Q60453774.
- Masters, Sarah L.; Robertson, Heather; Borisenko, Konstantin; et al. (2004). "The molecular structure of tetra-tert-butyldiphosphine: an extremely distorted, sterically crowded molecule". Dalton Transactions (16): 2469–2476. doi:10.1039/b407908f. PMID 15303161. Wikidata Q45012868.
- Fleischer, Holger; Wann, Derek; Masters, Sarah L.; Borisenko, Konstantin; Lewis, James R; Mawhorter, Richard J; Robertson, Heather; Rankin, David (2005). "Molecular structures of Se(SCH3)2 and Te(SCH3)2 using gas-phase electron diffraction and ab initio and DFT geometry optimisations". Dalton Transactions (19): 3221–3228. doi:10.1039/b505287b. PMID 16172648. Wikidata Q61302276.
- Y. Huang; Masters, Sarah L.; Krumdieck, Susan; Bishop, Catherine Mary (2021). "Phase field model of faceted anatase TiO2 dendrites in low pressure chemical vapor deposition". Applied Physics Letters. 119 (22): 221602. doi:10.1063/5.0071731. Wikidata Q110184753.
