= Harry Kay (psychologist) =

British psychologist (1919-2005)

Professor Harry Kay CBE
- Born: 22 March 1919
- Died: 19 December 2005 (aged 86)
- Board member of: Universities Central Council on Admissions; British Association for the Advancement of Science
- Spouse: Diana Kay
- Children: 2

Academic background
- Education: Rotherham Grammar School
- Alma mater: Trinity Hall, University of Cambridge
- Thesis: Experimental Studies of Adult Learning (1953)
- Influences: Frederic Bartlett

Academic work
- Discipline: Psychology
- Sub-discipline: Applied cognitive psychology, occupational Psychology
- Institutions: University of Sheffield; University of Oxford
- Doctoral students: Peter B. Warr
- Notable students: Neville Moray
- Main interests: Ageing, learning and memory

Vice-chancellor of University of Exeter
- In office 1973–1984
- Preceded by: John Llewellyn
- Succeeded by: Sir David Harrison

President of the British Psychological Society
- In office 1971–1972
- Preceded by: Harry Gwynne Jones
- Succeeded by: Max Hamilton
- Military career
- Allegiance: United Kingdom
- Branch: British Army
- Rank: Lieutenant colonel
- Unit: Royal Artillery
- Conflict: World War II

Harry Kay (1919–2005) was a British psychologist and academic administrator.

== Career ==
Kay attended Rotherham Grammar School and then in 1938 went to the University of Cambridge to read for a degree English. However, World War II intervened and he enlisted in the Royal Artillery, rising to the rank of lieutenant colonel. In 1946 he returned to Cambridge to complete a degree in Moral Sciences. He remained at Cambridge in the Nuffield Unit for Research into Problems of Ageing.

Kay moved to the University of Oxford in 1951 as a lecturer in experimental psychology. He continued his research and was awarded a PhD. Among his students at Oxford was Neville Moray, later known for his work on the cocktail party effect. Moray would go on to join Kay as a colleague at his next post at the University of Sheffield.

In 1960, Kay was appointed Chair of Psychology at the University of Sheffield. It was here that he established the Social and Applied Psychology Research Unit.

In 1973, he was appointed Vice-Chancellor of the University of Exeter. He remained there until his retirement in 1984.

He was active in the British Psychological Society becoming its president in 1971. In his presidential address, he promoted 'giving psychology away'.

== Research ==
Kay's early research interest was experimental work on motor skills and then moved into the more general area of occupational psychology.

During his time at Cambridge, Kay was influenced by the works of Frederic Bartlett, who inspired his interest in the practical application of psychology to address real world problems.

At Sheffield, Kay supervised Peter B. Warr's doctoral work, and the two later became close colleagues, co-founding the Social and Applied Psychology Research Unit.

== Honours ==
- 1971 - 1972 - President, British Psychological Society
- President, Experimental Psychology Society
- President, Psychology Section, British Association for the Advancement of Science
- Hon DSc – University of Sheffield
- Hon DSc – University of Exeter
- 1981 – CBE

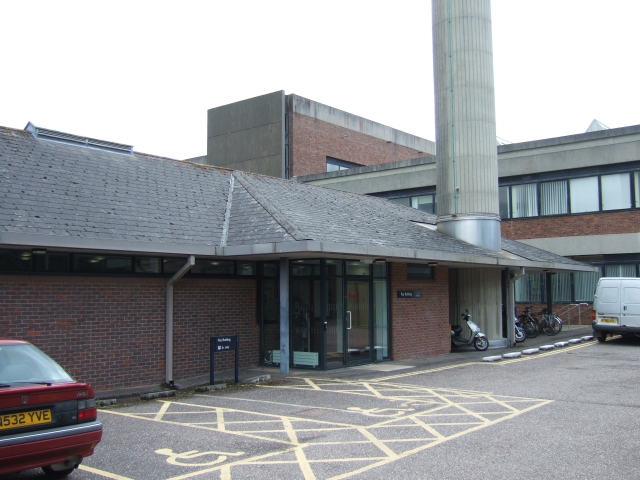
Kay Building on Streatham Campus of University of Exeter is named after Professor Harry Kay.

Academic offices
Preceded by John Llewellyn	Vice-Chancellor of the University of Exeter; 1973–1984	Succeeded by David Harrison
