= Philip J. Dolan =

American physicist

Philip Jarvis Dolan (October 5, 1923 – January 5, 1992) was an American physicist. He graduated from West Point in 1945, was assigned to the Manhattan Project in Los Alamos in 1948, and received his MSc in physics from the University of Virginia in 1956.

The son of a professor of military science at Purdue University, Dolan served in the Korean War before holding U.S. Army posts including instructor in nuclear weapons employment and nuclear effects project officer. He later worked for Lockheed Corporation and SRI International.

He is best known as co-author with Samuel Glasstone of the reference work The Effects of Nuclear Weapons, as well as first editor of the two-part edition of the U.S. Department of Defense's 1,651 page secret-restricted data manual, Capabilities of Nuclear Weapons (DNA-EM-1, 1 July 1972).

== Controversial publication ==
Dolan helped compile the controversial U.S. Army Field Manual, Nuclear Weapons Employment, FM 101–31, in 1963. Freeman Dyson commented on it in his 1984 book, Weapons and Hope: "The military doctrines summarised in FM 101-31 were valid... when tactical nuclear wars might have been small-scale and truly limited. The handbook represents a sincere attempt to put Oppenheimer's philosophy of local nuclear defence into practice."

J. Robert Oppenheimer said of this nuclear weapons capabilities question:

I am not qualified, and if I were qualified I would not be allowed, to give a detailed evaluation of the appropriateness of the use of atomic weapons against any or all such (military) targets; but one thing is very clear. It is clear that they can be used only as adjuncts in a military campaign which has some other components, and whose purpose is a military victory. They are not primarily weapons of totality or terror, but weapons used to give combat forces help they would otherwise lack. They are an integral part of military operations. Only when the atomic bomb is recognized as useful insofar as it is an integral part of military operations, will it really be of much help in the fighting of a war, rather than in warning all mankind to avert it. (Quotation: Samuel Cohen, Shame, 2nd ed., 2005, page 99.)

== Cold War deterrence and flexible nuclear capabilities ==
A detailed study of the collateral damage problems by Dolan and others resulted in the concept of the U.S. 'Triad' of nuclear silos, bombers and submarine missile platforms for 'cross-targeting' (using different delivery platforms; aircraft, submarines and missiles) and 'layering' (using repeated hits by accurate low yield weapons). These tactics limit the risk of failure, and also reduce individual bomb yields, thus preventing any serious collateral damage to nearby civilian areas (heavy fallout, blast, or fires). Dolan revealed in the Capabilities of Nuclear Weapons, 1972 (c. 14: p. 1, declassified on 13 February 1989):

One of the primary uses of nuclear weapons would be for the destruction of military field equipment.

Other major targets discussed are missiles, ships, and submarines, but the longest chapter dealt with radiation dose prediction for human beings from the perspective of avoiding collateral damage, Chapter 10 Personnel Casualties is one of the shortest in the manual, containing only 38 out of the 1,651 pages).

== Unclassified publications ==
Dolan contributed substantial discussions to two openly published books during the 1980s:

- Characteristics of the Nuclear Radiation Environment Produced by Several Types of Disasters, Summary Volume, published as Appendix A to the April 27–29, 1981 National Council on Radiation Protection and Measurements Symposium on the Control of Exposure of the Public to Ionizing Radiation in the Event of Accident or Attack
- Jack C. Greene & Daniel J. Strom (Editors), Would the Insects Inherit the Earth and Other Subjects of Concern to Those Who Worry About Nuclear War, Pergamon Press, London, 1988, 78pp

The strange title of this second book refers to the discovery that cockroaches will withstand 67,500 rem (American variety) or 90,000-105,000 rem (German variety), compared to a human lethal exposure of only about 800 rem. One theory which resulted from these observations on insects was that cockroaches, along with some simple plants and bacteria, would be likely to be the only lifeforms to survive a severe nuclear war. This theory was refuted by experience of the very rapid recovery on isolated islands exposed to close-in heavy fallout and other effects from massive hydrogen bombs at the Bikini Atoll and Eniwetok Atoll, as well as from smaller nuclear weapons in the Nevada Test Site and Australia (Montebello Islands, Maralinga and Emu Field). Full ecological recovery surveys were documented before and after each test series. (For a brief online introduction into some these studies - with specific reference to the ecological effects of the 1.69 megatons Operation Castle Nectar shot, detonated in 1954 on a barge above the crater of the 10.4 megatons Ivy Mike thermonuclear test in Eniwetok Atoll.)
