= Peter B. Warr =

British occupational psychologist

Professor Peter Bryan Warr
- Born: 18 June 1937; Birkenhead, Lancashire, UK
- Died: 18 February 2023 (aged 85)
- Education: University of Cambridge
- Occupation: Occupational psychologist
- Employer: University of Sheffield
- Notable work: Psychology at Work
- Children: 2

Peter Bryan Warr was a British occupational psychologist.

== Early life and education ==
Warr was born in Birkenhead in 1937. After leaving school, he went on to do national service before attending university.

Warr was awarded a BA from the University of Cambridge followed by a PhD from the University of Sheffield.

== Career and research ==
He spent the majority of his academic career at the University of Sheffield, which he joined in 1961. With Harry Kay, he established the Social and Applied Psychology Unit, of which he became director. The unit combined with the Institute of Work Psychology, from which Warr retired as emeritus professor.

== Personal life and other interests ==
In addition to his psychology career, Warr also researched local history. He was an archivist for the Ranmoor Society and he wrote and published ‘Sheffield In The Great War (2014)’ and ‘The Growth Of Ranmoor, Hangingwater and Nether Green (2009)’.

At the time of his death, Warr had two children and two grandchildren.

== Death ==
Warr died on 18 February 2023, aged 85.

== Work ==
He extensively researched various aspects of occupational psychology. In particular, he contributed substantially to the understanding of worker happiness and unhappiness.

== Awards ==
- 1999 - Honorary Fellow, British Psychological Society
- 1982 - Presidents' Award, British Psychological Society for outstanding contributions to psychological knowledge
- Fellow, International Association of Applied Psychology
- Fellow, Society of Industrial and Organizational Psychology
- 1969: Spearman Medal, British Psychological Society for distinguished research

== Publications ==
- Warr, P. B. (2019). The Psychology of Happiness. Oxford: Routledge.
- Warr, P. and Clapperton, G. (2009). The Joy of Work? Jobs, Happiness, and You. London: Routledge.
- Warr, P. B. (2007). Work, Happiness, and Unhappiness. New York: Routledge.
