= June Sutor =

New Zealand crystallographer (1927–1990)

- Born: Dorothy June Sutor; 6 June 1929; Auckland, New Zealand
- Died: 27 May 1990 (aged 60); London, England
- Education: Auckland University College (MSc, PhD); Newnham College, Cambridge (PhD)
- Known for: C−H···:O hydrogen bonds
- Scientific career
- Fields: Crystallography
- Workplaces: Birkbeck College; University College London
- Thesis: The crystal structure of dipotassium nitroacetate and ‑nitropropionic acid (1953)
- Doctoral advisors: Frederick John Llewellyn

Dorothy June Sutor (6 June 1929 – 27 May 1990) was a New Zealand-born crystallographer who spent most of her research career in England. She was one of the first scientists to establish that hydrogen bonds could form to hydrogen atoms bonded to carbon atoms. She later worked in the laboratory of Kathleen Lonsdale on the characterisation and prevention of urinary calculi.

== Early life and education ==
Sutor was born in New Zealand, in the Auckland suburb of Parnell, on 6 June 1929, the daughter of Victor Edward Sutor, a coach builder, and Cecilia Maud Sutor (née Craner). She was educated at St Cuthbert's College, and went on to study chemistry at Auckland University College. She graduated Master of Science with first-class honours in 1952 and, supervised by Frederick John Llewellyn, she graduated with her first PhD in 1954. She published her first single-author Acta Crystallographica paper, The unit cell and space group of ethyl nitrolic acid, whilst a student.

In 1954, Sutor went to the United Kingdom, and took up a travelling scholarship and Bathurst Studentship at Newnham College, Cambridge. There, she earned a PhD on the structures of purines and nucleosides in 1958. During her second doctorate, Sutor identified the structure of caffeine, and showed that it can readily recrystallise in its monohydrate form.

== Research and career ==
Sutor moved to Australia in 1958, working as a research officer in Melbourne. In 1959, she returned to Britain to take up an Imperial Chemical Industries Fellowship at Birkbeck College, where she worked with J. D. Bernal, Rosalind Franklin, and Aaron Klug on the application of X-ray crystallography in molecular biology. She worked on hydrogen bonding and computational chemistry, writing programs for the EDSAC. Sutor used the concept of electronegativity, introduced by Linus Pauling in 1932, to explain hydrogen bonds. She investigated the Van der Waals distances that are shortened during hydrogen bonding, and based on her findings proposed that a C–H group that is activated by partial ionization can take part in hydrogen bonding (so called C-H···O bonds). She investigated the structure of theacrine, DNA and other purine compounds. In 1962, Sutor published the first crystallographic evidence for C-H ⋯O bonding. Her work expanded from small-molecule crystal structures to alkaloids.

Her work was criticised by Jerry Donohue, who disputed her Van der Waals distances and claimed that she had data problems. At the time, Donohue's textbooks were in most laboratories, and he was a common reviewer for academic papers including crystal structures. Carl Schwalbe has speculated that this could have been due to academic jealousy, saying in 2019 that "acceptance of women in science, particularly the physical sciences, was by no means complete".

Sutor moved back to New Zealand, working briefly for the Department of Scientific and Industrial Research before taking leave to look after her father, who died in 1964. In 1966, Sutor was offered a job by Kathleen Lonsdale at University College London. She studied urinary calculi and searched for ways to prevent them. Sutor had good contacts with hospital staff, and even managed to secure Napoléon III's bladder stone. She was supported by a grant from the Nuffield Foundation. In 1979, Sutor became partially sighted, and more "interested in the theoretical aspects of stone growth".

== Death and legacy ==
Sutor died of cancer in London on 27 May 1990. She bequeathed her estate of over £500,000 for the establishment of June Sutor Fellowships for research at Moorfields Eye Hospital into the prevention of blindness.

Sutor's predictions on the hydrogen bond were confirmed by Robin Taylor and Olga Kennard in the 1980s. Their work included 113 neutron diffraction patterns in the Cambridge Crystallographic Database, and found that Sutor's C–H⋯O bond distances were correct to within 0.03 Å (0.003 nm). Gautam Radhakrishna Desiraju dedicated a chapter of his book on hydrogen bonds to the work of Sutor, and Carl Schwalbe compared the structures cited by Sutor to modern redeterminations.
