= C–H···O interaction =

In chemistry, a C–H···O interaction is occasionally described as a special type of weak hydrogen bond. These interactions frequently occur in the structures of important biomolecules like amino acids, proteins, sugars, DNA and RNA.

== History ==
The C–H···O interaction was discovered in 1937 by Samuel Glasstone. Glasstone studied properties of mixtures of acetone with different halogenated derivatives of hydrocarbons and realized that dipole moments of these mixtures differ from dipole moments of pure substances. He explained this by establishing the concept of C–H···O interactions. The first crystallographic analysis of C-H ⋯O hydrogen bonds were published by June Sutor in 1962.

== Properties ==
Similar to hydrogen bonds, a C–H···O interaction involves interactions of dipoles and therefore has directionality. The directionality of a C–H···O interaction is usually defined by the angle α between the C, H and O atoms, and the distance d between the O and C atoms. In a C–H···O interaction, the angle α is in the range between 90 and 180°, and the distance d is usually smaller than 3.2 Å. Bond strength is less than 1 kcal/mol. In the case of aromatic C–H donors, C–H···O interactions are not linear due to influence of aromatic ring substituents near the interacting C-H group. If aromatic molecules involved in C–H···O interaction belong to the group of polycyclic aromatic hydrocarbons, the strength of C–H···O interactions increases with the number of aromatic rings.

C–H···O interactions can be important in drug design, being present in structures of therapeutic proteins, and nucleic acids.

O-H···C and N-H···C type interactions could also play a significant role and were first analyzed in 1993.
