= Neil Waters =

New Zealand chemist and academic administrator

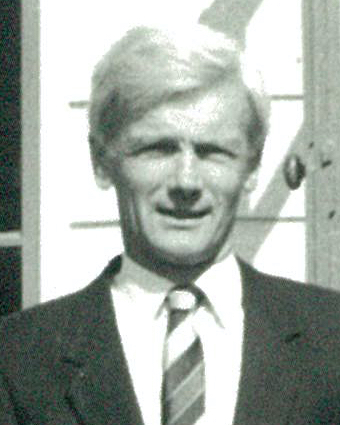
- Waters in 1985

2nd Vice-Chancellor of Massey University
- In office 1 February 1983 – 31 December 1995
- Preceded by: Alan Stewart
- Succeeded by: James McWha

Personal details
- Born: Thomas Neil Morris Waters; 10 April 1931 New Plymouth, New Zealand
- Died: 7 June 2018 (aged 87) Auckland, New Zealand
- Spouse: Joyce Mary Partridge (m. 1959)
- Scientific career
- Education: Auckland University College
- Fields: Inorganic chemistry
- Workplaces: Massey University; University of Auckland
- Thesis: The colour isomerism and structure of some copper co‑ordination compounds (1957)
- Doctoral advisor: David Hall; John Llewellyn
- Doctoral students: Ted Baker

Sir Thomas Neil Morris Waters (10 April 1931 – 7 June 2018) was a New Zealand inorganic chemist and academic administrator who served as vice-chancellor of Massey University from 1983 to 1995. He is noted for establishing the university's Albany campus near Auckland in 1993, with a new building also named in his honour, opening in June, 2026.

== Early life, family, and education ==
Born in New Plymouth on 10 April 1931, Waters was the son of Kathleen Emily Waters (née Morris) and Edwin Benjamin Waters. He was educated at New Plymouth Boys' High School, and went on to study chemistry at Auckland University College, graduating Bachelor of Science in 1953, Master of Science with second-class honours the following year, and PhD in 1958. His doctoral thesis, supervised by David Hall and John Llewellyn, was titled The colour isomerism and structure of some copper co‑ordination compounds.

In 1959, Waters married crystallographer Joyce Mary Partridge.

== Academic career ==
Waters was appointed as a lecturer in chemistry at Auckland in 1961, rising to the rank of full professor in 1970. In 1969, he was awarded the degree of Doctor of Science by the University of Auckland on the basis of published papers submitted.

Waters served as assistant vice chancellor of the University of Auckland between 1979 and 1981, including a period in 1980 as acting vice chancellor. He left Auckland at the end of 1982, and was accorded the title of professor emeritus by the university in 1984.

In 1983, Waters was appointed as principal and vice chancellor of Massey University, serving in that role until 1995. In 1995, Massey also bestowed the title of professor emeritus on Waters.

During his career, Waters served on a range of university, science sector, and government bodies, including: the council of the Australian and New Zealand Association for the Advancement of Science from 1977 to 1979; the board of the New Zealand University Grants Committee in 1982; the New Zealand Vice Chancellors' Committee from 1983 to 1995, including periods as chair in 1984–85 and 1994; the council of Palmerston North College of Education from 1983 to 1988, the council of Manawatu Polytechnic from 1983 to 1990, as chair of the Foundation for Research, Science and Technology between 1995 and 1998; and chair of the New Zealand Qualifications Authority from 1995 to 1999.

== Later life and death ==
From 1997, Waters was an honorary senior research fellow at Massey University's Albany campus, where his wife Joyce was a professor of chemistry.

In 2002, Massey University's governing council considered restoring Waters to the vice-chancellorship as an interim replacement following the retirement of his successor, James McWha; however, the board was prevented from doing so by the State Sector Act 1988, which barred the appointment of someone not already on the university's payroll; Waters had since moved to Auckland and no longer worked in the university sector.

Waters died in Auckland on 7 June 2018, aged 87.

== Honours and awards ==
In 1990, Waters was awarded the New Zealand 1990 Commemoration Medal. In the 1995 Queen's Birthday Honours, he was appointed a Knight Bachelor, for services to tertiary education.

Waters was conferred with honorary Doctor of Science degrees by the University of East Asia in 1986, and Massey University in 1996. He was elected a Fellow of the New Zealand Institute of Chemistry in 1977, Fellow of the Australian and New Zealand Association for the Advancement of Science in 1979, and Fellow of the Royal Society of New Zealand in 1992.
