= Keith J. Laidler =

British-born Canadian chemist (1916–2003)

- Born: January 3, 1916; Liverpool, England
- Died: August 26, 2003 (aged 87); Ottawa, Canada
- Citizenship: Canadian
- Education: Trinity College, Oxford; Princeton University
- Known for: Chemical kinetics
- Scientific career
- Fields: Physical chemist
- Institutions: Catholic University of America; University of Ottawa
- Thesis: The Kinetics of Reactions in Condensed and Heterogeneous Systems (1940)
- Doctoral advisor: Henry Eyring
- Other academic advisors: Cyril Norman Hinshelwood
- Doctoral students: Joseph Weber

Keith James Laidler (January 3, 1916 – August 26, 2003), born in England, was notable as a pioneer in chemical kinetics and authority on the physical chemistry of enzymes.

== Education ==
Laidler received his early education at Liverpool College. He received his BA (1934) and MA (1938) degrees from Oxford University as a student of Trinity College. His MA was in the area of chemical kinetics under Cyril Hinshelwood. He completed his PhD in 1940 from Princeton University, with a thesis entitled: The Kinetics of Reactions in Condensed and Heterogeneous Systems, under Henry Eyring. He was a National Research Council of Canada Postdoctoral Fellow (1940–1942). He died in Ottawa in 2003.

== Career ==
After a decade at the Catholic University of America (1946-1955), he spent the remainder of his academic career at the University of Ottawa (1955–1981), where he served as Chairman of the Department of Chemistry and Vice-Dean of the Faculty of Science. He was the author of 13 books and more than 250 articles. In his early years he worked with Cyril Hinshelwood on the theory of chemical kinetics, extending this during his doctoral work to the theory of absolute reaction rates with Henry Eyring and Samuel Glasstone. As an independent researcher in Ottawa he worked increasingly on enzymes, with both theoretical and experimental studies. He wrote several books of chemistry, and among these The Chemical Kinetics of Enzyme Action (1958) was for more than ten years by far the most important source of information on the subject. A second edition, written with Peter S. Bunting, appeared in 1973. After his retirement Laidler increasingly worked on the history of science, and wrote books on the history of physical chemistry and its relationship with technology.

Laidler was a Fellow of the Royal Society of Canada, which described him "as one of the twentieth-century pioneers in the remarkable progress made in chemical kinetics leading to the development of transition state theory which provides the modern kinetic theory. Laidler's work includes seminal contributions in several areas of the field: gas phase reactions; kinetic aspects of reactivity of electronically excited molecules and construction of potential energy surfaces for such processes; development of treatments for kinetics and mechanisms for surface reactions and solution reactions, introducing modern concepts of solvation through dielectric polarization effects in the treatment of ionic redox reactions and of reactions producing or consuming ions; gas phase free-radical reactions involving pyrolysis and other thermal decomposition processes; and … the kinetics of enzyme-catalyzed reactions."

== Honors ==
Laidler's numerous honors include the University of Ottawa's Award for Excellence in Research (1971), the Chemical Institute of Canada's Union Carbide Award for Chemical Education (1974) as well as the Queen's Jubilee Medal (1977), the Centenary Medal (1982), and the Henry Marshall Tory Medal (1987), all from the Royal Society of Canada, and honorary degrees from Simon Fraser University, Burnaby, British Columbia, Canada (1997) and from the University of Lethbridge, Alberta, Canada (1999). For his work in the history of physical chemistry the American Chemical Society's Division of the History of Chemistry awarded him its Dexter Award "for outstanding contributions to the history of chemistry" (1996).

Laidler retired in 1981 but continued to lecture as professor emeritus. He died on August 26, 2003. In 2004, the Canadian Society for Chemistry renamed their Noranda Award as the Keith Laidler Award in his memory.

== See also ==
- Chemical kinetics
- Enzymes
