= David Hall (chemist) =

New Zealand chemist (1928–2016)

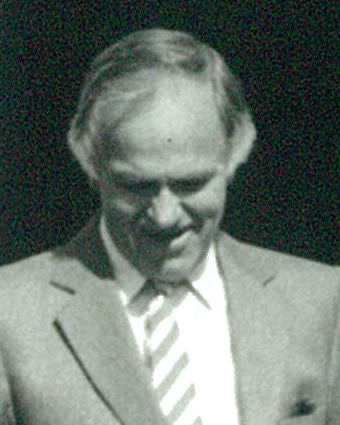
- Hall in 1985
- Born: 15 February 1928
- Died: 15 June 2016 (aged 88); Auckland, New Zealand
- Education: Auckland University College
- Awards: FRSNZ (1972)
- Scientific career
- Fields: Chemistry, X-ray crystallography
- Workplaces: University of Auckland; University of Alberta
- Thesis: The crystal structure of formamidoxime (1954)
- Doctoral advisor: John Llewellyn
- Doctoral students: Ted Baker; Guy Dodson; Joyce Waters; Neil Waters

David Hall (15 February 1928 – 15 June 2016) was a New Zealand chemist, best known as an X-ray crystallographer.

== Biography ==
A student at Auckland University College, Hall graduated Master of Science in 1950 and a PhD in 1955. The title of his thesis was The Crystal Structure of Formamidoxime. He was one of the first research students in New Zealand in the area of X-ray crystallography, following the establishment of that research area at Auckland University College by John Llewellyn in 1948. The subject of both his master's and doctoral theses was the crystal structure of formamidoxime.

Hall was appointed to the academic staff of the Department of Chemistry at Auckland in 1950, and following the departure of Llewellyn in 1956, he became head of the crystallography research group. He was appointed professor and head of the Department of Chemistry at Auckland in 1965, but left to become professor of chemistry at the University of Alberta the following year. However, he returned to Auckland in 1968, and succeeded Peter de la Mare as head of department in 1980, serving in that role until his retirement in 1984, when he was conferred with the title of professor emeritus by the university. Hall was appointed chair of the New Zealand University Grants Committee in late 1984.

Hall was awarded a DSc by thesis from the University of Auckland in 1969, and he was elected a Fellow of the Royal Society of New Zealand in 1972. His doctoral students included Neil Waters, Guy Dodson, and Ted Baker.

Hall died at his home in Auckland on 15 June 2016.
