= Keith Cox =

British geologist (1933–1998)

Professor Keith Gordon Cox FRS
- Born: April 25, 1933
- Died: August 27, 1998 (aged 65); Erraid, Isle of Mull
- Education: King Edward VI School, Birmingham; Leeds Grammar School; University of Oxford (B.A.); University of Leeds (PhD)
- Spouse: Gillian Mary Palmer
- Father: Sir Ernest Gordon Cox FRS
- Awards: Murchison Medal (1986)
- Scientific career
- Workplaces: University of Edinburgh; University of Oxford
- Thesis: (1960)
- Doctoral advisor: W.Q. Kennedy

Keith Gordon Cox FRS (25 April 1933 – 27 August 1998) was a British geologist and academic at the University of Oxford. He had a particular interest in flood basalts and was regarded as one of the leading experts in this area.

== Life and career ==
Cox was born in Birmingham, England, where his father, Sir Gordon Cox FRS, was a university lecturer in chemistry. After wartime evacuation to Canada, Cox attended King Edward's School, Birmingham and Leeds Grammar School. He completed national service in the Royal Engineers between 1950 and 1952. He then took a scholarship to The Queen's College, Oxford, where he obtained a first-class degree in geology in 1956. He lost an eye in an accident in the Lake District whilst on a field trip in 1955. After Oxford, Cox carried out further research at the University of Leeds before being appointed lecturer in petrology at Edinburgh University. In 1972 he became a lecturer in geology at Oxford, being appointed a fellow of Jesus College, Oxford in 1973. He was awarded the Murchison Medal of the Geological Society of London in 1986, and in 1988 was appointed a Reader and elected a Fellow of the Royal Society. He made several trips to South Africa and collaborated with local geochemists such as Dr. A.J. Erlank. He drowned in a sailing accident at Erraid off the Isle of Mull in the Hebrides on 27 August 1998.

== Work ==
Cox's doctoral and post-doctoral research at Leeds was on the Masukwe Complex in the Nuanetsi region of what was then called Southern Rhodesia. This led to his developing a particular interest in flood basalts, upon which topic he in due course became a world expert. Cox contemplated the significance of the geochemistry of these rocks during his work in the Karoo region and, whilst at Edinburgh, also studied comparable rocks from the Deccan area of India, as well as rocks from southern Arabia. His research at Oxford also covered flood basalts in the Parana region of South America, the Hebrides and Antarctica. He also studied kimberlites.

He edited the Journal of Petrology (1971–83) and Earth and Planetary Science Letters (1981–85). He also wrote two textbooks: An Introduction to the Practical Study of Crystals, Minerals and Rocks (1967) (with N. B. Price and B. Harte) and The Interpretation of Igneous Rocks (1979) (with J. D. Bell and R. J. Pankhurst).

Cox's papers and correspondence are archived at the Oxford University Museum of Natural History, though there is little to record of Cox's lectures and conferences 'since he virtually never wrote or delivered a prepared text'.
