= Harold Taylor (architectural historian) =

New Zealand-born British polymath

Harold McCarter Taylor, CBE, TD (13 May 1907 – 23 October 1995) was a New Zealand-born British mathematician, theoretical physicist and academic administrator, but is best known as a historian of architecture and the author, with his first wife Joan Taylor, née Sills, of the three volumes of Anglo-Saxon Architecture, published between 1965 and 1978.

== Life and career ==
Taylor was born in Dunedin, son of a merchant, and graduated with an MSc from the University of Otago, whence he continued in 1928 to the University of Cambridge. He worked with Ernest Rutherford at the Cavendish Laboratory in Cambridge, received his PhD in 1933 and became a university lecturer and a Fellow of Clare College. While still in New Zealand he had been an officer in the New Zealand Artillery, and on 3 March 1934 he was commissioned as a lieutenant in the university Officer Training Corps, commanding the artillery section.

He was promoted local captain on 10 March 1934, and received that rank on a substantive basis on 24 November 1935, and was promoted major on 1 May 1936.

Following the start of World War II, he was transferred to the Royal Artillery on 30 April 1941, rising to be Senior Instructor in Gunnery at the Royal School of Artillery, with the rank of temporary lieutenant-colonel, and was awarded the Efficiency Decoration (TD). He was awarded the Lefroy Medal of the Royal Artillery, the only non-regular recipient, for "furthering the science and application of artillery"

His experience as a lecturer came in useful when he was a student on a staff course, and the instructor was having great difficulty explaining the difference between two types of gunsight, he offered to help the instructor explain (to the horror of the other students), and was then thanked by the instructor, "Thank you now we all know". He returned to part-time service after the war, and on his eventual retirement from the army in 1957, he was permitted to retain the honorary rank of lieutenant-colonel.

After the war, Taylor was appointed university treasurer in Cambridge. He continued in academic administration as Principal of the University College of North Staffordshire in 1961. When, in 1962, the college became the Keele University, he became its first vice-chancellor and served until 1967. He was appointed Commander of the Order of the British Empire (CBE) in the 1955 Queen's Birthday Honours.

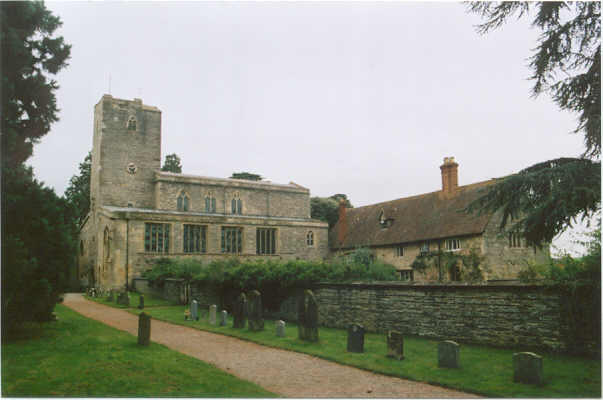
St Mary's Priory Church, Deerhurst, one of the Anglo-Saxon buildings investigated by Taylor

Taylor developed an interest in Anglo-Saxon architecture early in life. With his wife Joan, née Sills (1903–1965), whom he had married in 1933, he began a survey of more than 400 churches with some remnants of Anglo-Saxon architecture, culminating in the publication in 1965 of the first two volumes of their co-authored Anglo-Saxon Architecture. Joan died a few weeks before publication. In 1966, Taylor married as his second wife his personal assistant Dorothy Judith Samuel (born 1931), who co-authored the third volume of his work.

The archeologist Philip Rahtz, with whom Taylor collaborated in the investigation of St Mary's Priory Church, Deerhurst, describes Taylor as a "devout Christian" and as "unfailingly elegant, witty, gracious and neat. Rahtz notes in his obituary of Taylor: "Although he wore old clothes in the field, they were always pressed and clean. We could never understand how they remained so, even when he was clambering on dirty roofs or in and out of trenches."

Taylor was a Fellow of the Society of Antiquaries of London. In 1981, the Society awarded him and Charles Thomas the first Frend Medal, set up by the church historian and archaeologist William Hugh Clifford Frend, "for services to early Christian archaeology". He was appointed a member of the Royal Commission on the Historical Monuments of England on 1 January 1972.

He died in St Neots, Cambridgeshire, and his cremated remains were scattered in the Parish of the Ascension Burial Ground in Cambridge.

== Bibliography ==
- Anon., "Harold McCartet (sic!) Taylor, C.B.E., T.D., M.A., M.Sc., Ph.D.", obituary at the website of the Society of Antiquaries of London (accessed 2 August 2008)
- Rahtz, Philip, Harold Taylor, obituary, British Archaeology, no 10, December 1995 (accessed 2 August 2008)
- Waite, Greg, "Taylor, Harold McCarter (1907-1995)", Oxford Dictionary of National Biography, Oxford University Press, Sept 2004; online edn, Oct 2007 (accessed 2 August 2008)

Academic offices
Preceded by Sir George Barnes	Principal, University College of North Staffordshire (now Keele University); 1960-61	Succeeded by same
Preceded by same	Vice-Chancellor, Keele University; 1961-67	Succeeded by Professor W. A. Campbell Stewart
