= Institute of Knowledge Transfer =

UK professional body

- Abbreviation: IKT
- Formation: May 2007
- Dissolved: March 2020
- Legal status: Non-profit company
- Purpose: Knowledge transfer in the UK
- Headquarters: Portland Place, London, W1
- Region served: UK
- President: Sir Brian Fender FInstKT
- Main organ: IKT Board (Chairman – Adrian Hill)
- Affiliations: Institute of Physics
- Website: IKT

The Institute of Knowledge Transfer (IKT) was the sole accredited professional body open to all those who predominantly work in the broad and emerging profession of knowledge transfer.

== History ==
It was established in May 2007 as an 'Institute' with approval of the UK's (previously) Department of Trade and Industry's Secretary of State's, the IKT is a not-for-profit Company By Guarantee. The IKT received initial funding from the HEFCE covering a three year period from March 2007 to March 2010. In May 2009, HEFCE informed the IKT board that there would be no further core funding beyond 2010, but that the outstanding funding could be retained to be spread over a longer period after March 2010. The Board took measures to reduce expenditure in an endeavour to maintain the organisation as a viable organisation.

In 2020, the company was dissolved, with many of its functions and capabilities either being transferred to or taken over by Innovate UK KTN, then the Knowledge Transfer Network.

== Function ==
The objectives of the IKT were to assist in the process of turning technology, know-how, expertise and skills into innovative, commercial products and services by improving the standards of competency knowledge transfer practitioners and by stimulating the quality and provision of training.

It produced the Exchange magazine every quarter.

== Structure ==
As with other legitimate professional bodies in the UK, membership of the IKT was recognised by the UK HM Revenue and Customs as a tax deductible expense.

It was situated on Portland Place (A4201), south of Regent's Park tube station. The IKT was based at the Institute of Physics's headquarters in London UK, but was open to members from any territory. Membership of the IKT was also open to members from both private sector and public sectors working in roles that focus on the exchange and innovative application of knowledge.

Under the Presidency of Sir Brian Fender (Chair of BTG and former Chief Executive of the Higher Education Funding Council for England), the IKT had the support of a host of existing organisations in the knowledge transfer domain (including: AIRTO, UKSPA, HEFCE, the CBI, Welsh Assembly Government, Universities UK, UK Intellectual Property Office, and ProTon Europe, amongst others). It differed from existing organisations in this space in that it was open only to individuals that met established competency criteria. These criteria included relevant educational qualification, relevant career and CPD and was assessed by an independent Membership and Professional Standards Committee (constituted KT professionals in the UK, North America and continental Europe).

== See also ==
- National Research Development Corporation
