= Joyce Waters =

New Zealand inorganic chemist and crystallographer

Joyce Waters ONZM
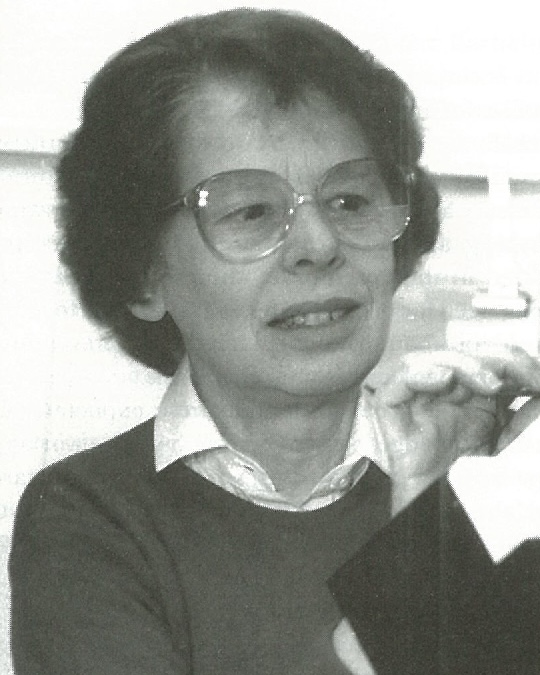
- Born: Joyce Mary Partridge; 2 June 1931 (age 94); Auckland, New Zealand
- Education: Diocesan School for Girls
- Alma mater: Auckland University College
- Spouse: Neil Waters (m. 1959; died 2018)
- Scientific career
- Fields: X-ray crystallography
- Institutions: University of Auckland; Massey University
- Thesis: A study of some co-ordination compounds formed between nickel diamines and the nitrite ion (1960)
- Doctoral advisors: John Llewellyn; David Hall

Joyce Mary Waters, Lady Waters ONZM (née Partridge; born 2 June 1931) is a New Zealand inorganic chemist and X-ray crystallographer, who is currently professor emeritus at Massey University. She was the second woman to receive a PhD in chemistry at the University of Auckland, and the first woman to serve as president of the New Zealand Institute of Chemistry.

== Early life and family ==
Waters was born Joyce Mary Partridge in Auckland on 2 June 1931, the daughter of Mary Elizabeth Partridge (née Harrison) and Thomas Harold Charles Partridge. She was educated at Diocesan School for Girls, Auckland, from 1938 to 1949, and went on to study at Auckland University College, graduating Bachelor of Science in 1954, Master of Science with first-class honours in 1955, and PhD in 1960. The title of her doctoral thesis, supervised by John Llewellyn and David Hall, was A study of some co-ordination compounds formed between nickel diammines and the nitrite ion. She was the second woman to complete a PhD in chemistry at Auckland.

In 1959, she married fellow inorganic chemist Neil Waters, who was knighted in 1995.

== Academic career ==
Waters was appointed as a lecturer in chemistry at the University of Auckland in 1961, rising to the rank of associate professor. In 1983, she joined Massey University as a senior research fellow and associate professor in chemistry, and in 2000 she was made a full professor at Massey's Albany campus. Following her retirement, she was conferred with the title of professor emeritus.

Her research focused on the determination of molecular structure using X-ray crystallography. An early publication by Waters was the first to describe the structure of a coordination complex containing a metal–hydrogen bond.

Waters served as president of the New Zealand Institute of Chemistry in 1989–1990, and was the first woman to hold the position.

== Later life ==
Following her formal retirement, Waters continued part-time research and teaching activities at Massey Albany. Her husband, Neil Waters, died in Auckland in 2018.

== Honours and awards ==
In 1996, Waters was awarded the Massey Medal of Massey University, in recognition of services to the university and to science. In the 2006 New Year Honours, she was appointed an Officer of the New Zealand Order of Merit, for services to chemistry.

Waters was elected a Fellow of the Royal Society of New Zealand in 1999, and is also a Fellow of the New Zealand Institute of Chemistry.
