= Charmian O'Connor =

New Zealand physical organic chemist

Dame Charmian O'Connor DNZM CBE JP
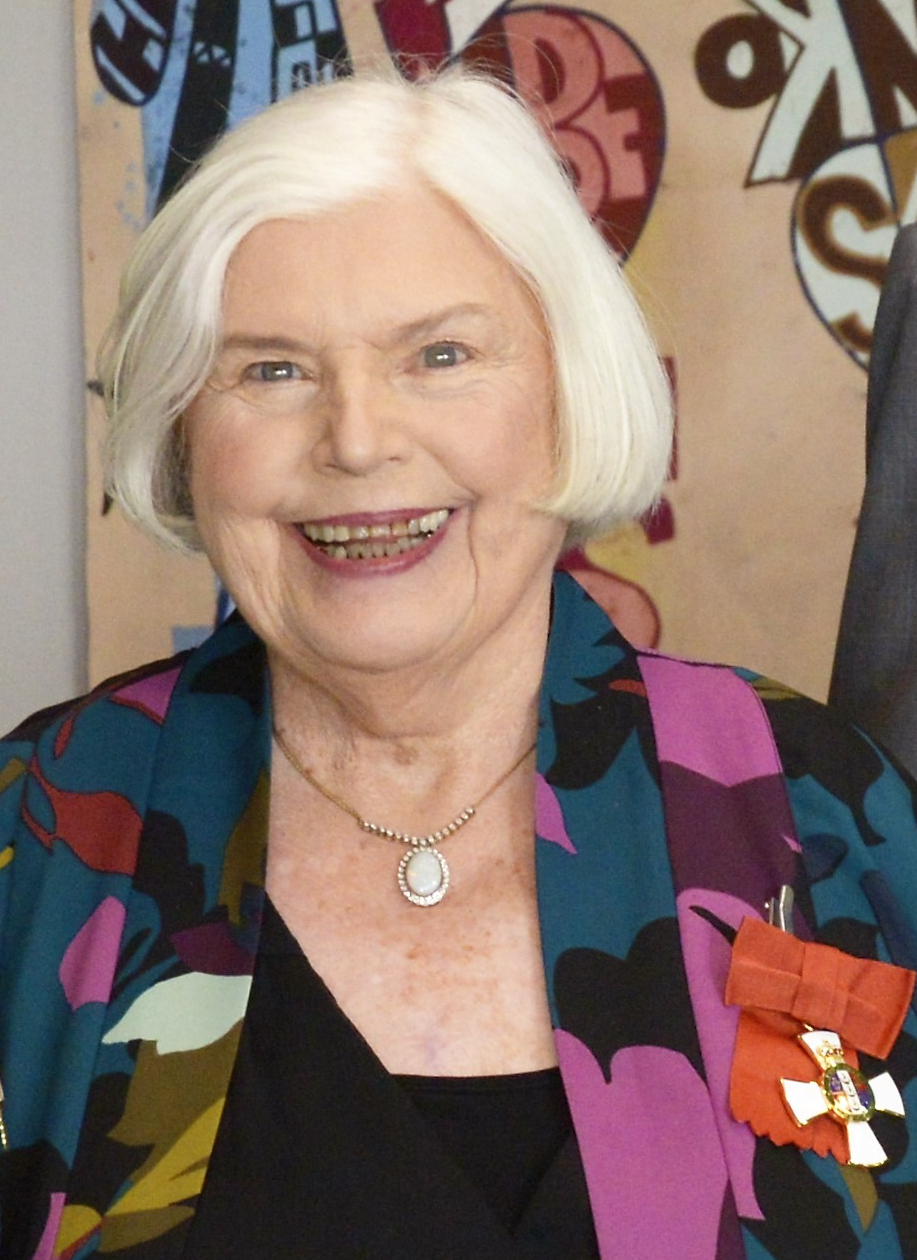
- O'Connor in 2018
- Born: Charmian Jocelyn Bishop; 4 August 1937 (age 88); Woodville, New Zealand
- Education: BSc (1957); MSc(Hons) (1958); PhD (1963); DSc (1973)
- Alma mater: University of Auckland
- Scientific career
- Fields: Physical organic chemistry
- Institutions: University of Auckland; University College London; University of California, Santa Barbara; Texas A&M University; Imperial College London; Nagasaki University; University of Tokushima

Dame Charmian Jocelyn O'Connor DNZM CBE JP (née Bishop, born 4 August 1937) is a New Zealand physical organic chemist. She became the first female professor of chemistry at the University of Auckland in 1986, and retired in 2004.

== Early life and education ==
Born in Woodville on 4 August 1937, the daughter of Cecil and Kathrene Bishop, O'Connor was educated at Hastings High School and Auckland Girls' Grammar School. She went on to study chemistry at Auckland University College, graduating Bachelor of Science in 1957, Master of Science with first-class honours in 1958, and completing a PhD in physical organic chemistry in 1963 at what by that time had become the University of Auckland.

== Academic and research career ==
O'Connor was appointed as a lecturer in chemistry at Auckland University College in 1958, rising to the rank of professor in 1986, becoming Auckland's first female professor of chemistry. When she retired in 2004, O'Connor was conferred the title of professor emeritus by the University of Auckland.

O'Connor has also held visiting positions at several other universities. In 1963, she took leave from Auckland to be a postdoctoral researcher at University College London, having been awarded a fellowship by New Zealand Federation of University Women, which also paid for her research trip to University of California, Santa Barbara in the same year. She returned to London in 1972, this time for a post at Imperial College, where she worked with future Nobel laureate Geoffrey Wilkinson, supported by a grant from the Canadian Federation of University Women. The same year, she received a Fulbright grant for a visiting position at Texas A&M University. O'Connor also held visiting professorships at Universities of Nagasaki and Tokushima in Japan.

O'Connor authored or co-authored more than 300 scientific papers in refereed journals. Her research focused on the mechanisms and kinetics of reactions involving biologically active compounds. In 1973, she was conferred the degree of Doctor of Science (DSc) by the University of Auckland on the basis of published papers submitted, becoming the first woman in New Zealand to be awarded a DSc.

During her career at Auckland, O'Connor held many administrative roles at the university, including serving as the inaugural assistant vice-chancellor, equal employment opportunities and staff development, from 1987 to 1998, and deputy vice-chancellor in 1994.

== Other activities ==
O'Connor served as a member of the Ministerial Advisory Group for science and technology, and on the national commission for UNESCO. Between 1979 and 1981, she was the national president of the New Zealand Federation of University Women. In 2005, she founded the Kate Edger Foundation, which awards upwards of NZ$600,000 in scholarships and fellowships to women annually. A Master’s Degree in Science scholarship of NZ$8,000 is awarded annually by the foundation in O'Connor's honour. She served as the foundation's chair of trustee board for nine years from its establishment and remained as a trustee until 2021.

O'Connor served on the councils of a number of educational institutions, including the Manukau Institute of Technology, Unitec Institute of Technology, and the Diocesan School for Girls.

Between 1961 and 1962, O'Connor was the secretary of the Auckland branch of the New Zealand Institute of Chemistry, and was later a member of the Academy Council of the Royal Society of New Zealand.

In 1982, O'Connor was appointed as a justice of the peace.

== Honours and awards ==
In the 1989 Queen's Birthday Honours, O'Connor was appointed a Commander of the Order of the British Empire, for services to chemistry, education and the community. She became a Dame Companion of the New Zealand Order of Merit, for services to chemistry and education, in the 2018 Queen's Birthday Honours.

O'Connor was elected a Fellow of the Royal Society of New Zealand in 1986, and is also a Fellow of the Royal Society of Chemistry and a Fellow of the New Zealand Institute of Chemistry.

In 2018, during the celebrations to mark 125 years of women's suffrage in New Zealand, the science faculty at the University of Auckland was temporarily renamed the Dame Charmian O'Connor Faculty of Science in honour of O'Connor's contribution to science.

== Personal life ==
In 1963, she married Peter Selwyn O'Connor and took on his surname. The couple have a son and a daughter.
