= Helen Sarah Thomas =

Black British writer and poet

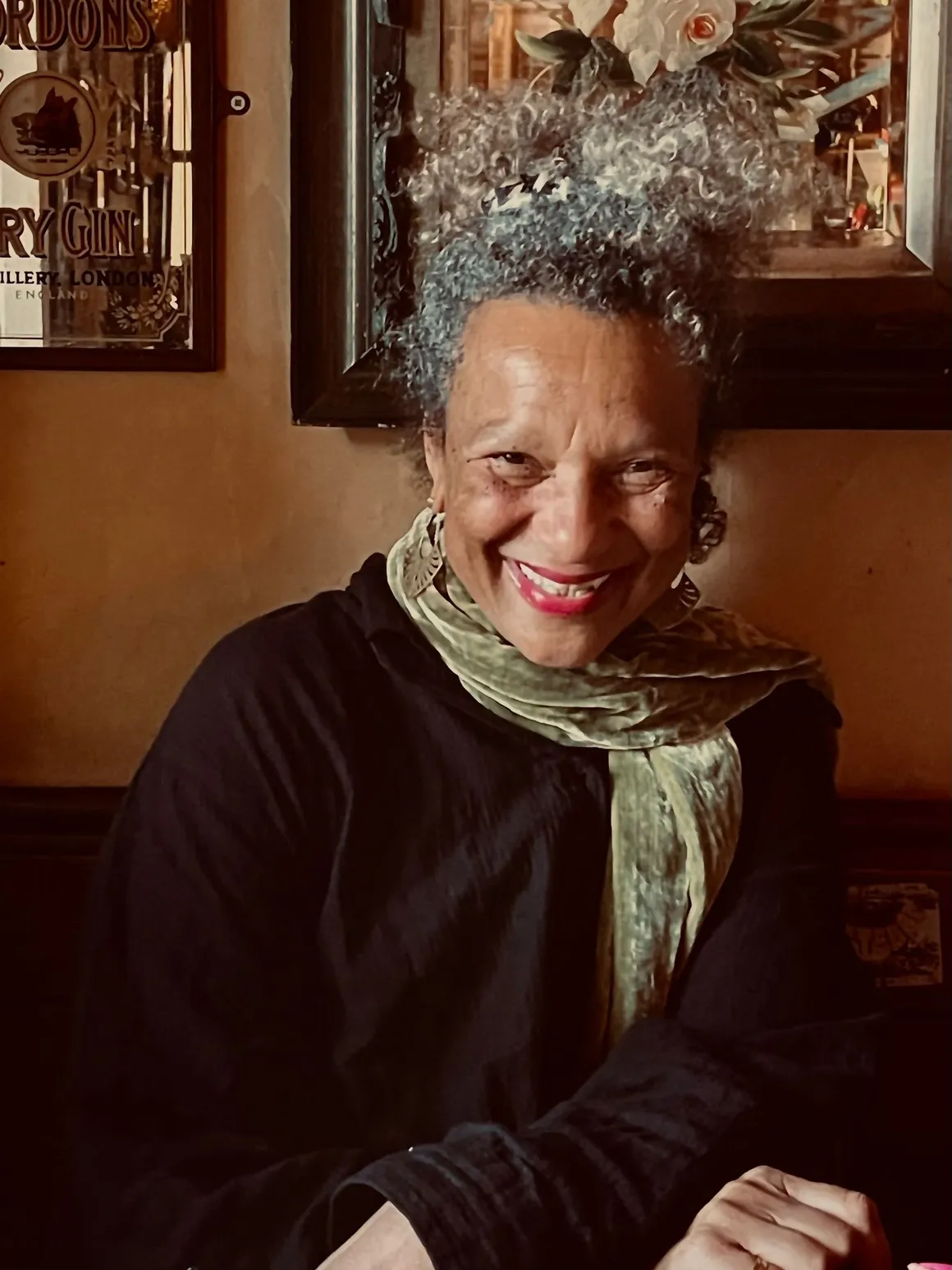
- Education: Keele University; Oxford University
- Occupations: Writer and poet

Helen Thomas is a poet, author and researcher of Sierra Leonean and Irish heritage whose work focuses primarily upon poetry performance, Black British writing, history and culture, and the medical humanities. She is senior co-editor of the Special Collection, Poetry Off the Page: Intersecting Practices and Traditions in British Poetry Performance (2025), and author of "Intersecting Practices and Traditions in Poetry Performance: Interviews with Suhaiymah Manzoor-Khan, Anthony Joseph and Marsha Prescod" (2025), "'Talking Back' in Poetry Performance: Black Feminist Thought, Matricentric Feminism & Maternal Loss" (2025), Romanticism and Slave Narratives: Transatlantic Testimonies (Cambridge University Press, 2000), Caryl Phillips (2004), Malady and Mortality: Illness, Disease and Death in Literary Culture (2016) and a free, 500-page book published to support Black Lives Matter entitled Black Agents Provocateurs: 250 Years of Black British Writing, History and the Law, 1770–2020 (2020).

In December 2024, Exeter College, Oxford University unveiled a photo portrait of Thomas in honour of her achievements and contributions as part of a series to celebrate women of African or Caribbean descent connected with the college.

In 2022, Thomas published 1562, a volume of poetry voicing the fictional lives of six black women from six ports in 16th-century Britain. In 2022, her semi-autobiographical poetic / dance play, Salve, was showcased at the Theatre Royal, Plymouth and, in 2023, her historical poetic drama was longlisted by the RSC's 37 Plays Competition and shortlisted as the Word Laureate in Plymouth. She is currently part of the "Poetry Off the Page" team, directed by Dr. Julia Lajta-Novak (University of Vienna), in collaboration with the British poetry organization Apples and Snakes, the Royal Central School of Speech and Drama, Goldsmiths University of London, Queen Mary University of London, University College Dublin, and the National Library of Ireland. Thomas is a member of the Royal Society of Authors and the Black Writers Guild, and a founding member of "Cornwall and Devon Creative Collective CIC".

== Early life ==
After completing a BA Hons. degree in English Literature and American Studies (First Class) from Keele University, Thomas received an MPhil and DPhil in Literature from Oxford University.

== Publications ==
- Andrea Brady, Peter Howarth and Helen Thomas (editors), Poetry Off the Page: Intersecting Practices and Traditions in British Poetry Performance (2025); https://olh.openlibhums.org/collections/1205/
- Helen Thomas, "Intersecting Practices and Traditions in Poetry Performance: Interviews with Suhaiymah Manzoor-Khan, Anthony Joseph and Marsha Prescod" (2025), Open Library of Humanities 11(1). doi: https://doi.org/10.16995/olh.23434.
- Helen Thomas, "'Talking Back' in Poetry Performance: Black Feminist Thought, Matricentric Feminism & Maternal Loss", March 2025.
- Helen Thomas, "Poetry Performance MCs" (podcast), https://poetryoffthepage.net/podcast/episode-3-poetry-performance-mcs/, May 2025.
- Helen Thomas, 1562 (2022). Poetry with black and white illustrations. ISBN 9781838159535. 69 pages. https://npl.southbankcentre.co.uk/P10311UK/OPAC/Details/Record.aspx?BibCode=69542748
- Helen Thomas, "Women Writing Creole Masculinity", Women Writing Men: 1689 to 1869, ed. Joanne Ella Parsons and Ruth Heholt (Routledge, 2022).
- Helen Thomas, Black Agents Provocateurs: 250 Years of Black British Writing, History and the Law, 1770-2020 (Ebook 2020; print edition, 2021), 500pp.
- Helen Thomas, "Women Writing Creole Masculinity", Women's Writing, Vol. 28, Issue 2 (Taylor and Francis, 2021), pp. 283–304.
- Helen Thomas, ed. Malady and Mortality: Illness, Disease and Death in Literary and Visual Culture (Cambridge Scholars, 2016), 351pp.
- Helen Thomas, "Freeze Frame: Paralysis and Locked in Syndrome in Three Contemporary Texts" in Malady and Mortality: Illness, Disease and Death in Literary and Visual Culture (Cambridge Scholars, 2016), pp. 129–139.
- Helen Thomas, "The Slave Narrative" in The Handbook of Transatlantic North American Studies, ed. Julia Straub (De Gruyter, 2016), pp. 373–390.
- Helen Thomas, "Slave Narratives and Transatlantic Literature", in The Oxford Handbook of the African American Slave Narrative, ed. John Ernest (New York: Oxford University Press, 2014), pp. 371–390.
- Helen Thomas, "1950s–1980s: Contextual Introduction", in Modern and Contemporary Black British Theatre, ed. Mary Brewer, Lynette Goddard, Deirdre Osborne (London: Palgrave Macmillan, 2014), pp. 17–31.
- Helen Thomas, "Breast Cancer Autopathographies: The Law of the Body and the Body of the Law", Scenes Of Intimacy: Reading, Writing and Theorizing Contemporary Literature, ed. Jennifer Cooke (Bloomsbury Academic, 2013)
- Helen Thomas, Caryl Phillips (Tavistock: Northcote Press, 2006), 100pp.
- Helen Thomas, "Romanticism and Abolitionism: Mary Wollstonecraft, William Blake, Samuel Taylor Coleridge and William Wordsworth", in Romanticism: Critical Concepts in Literary and Cultural Studies, Routledge Major Work Series (London: Routledge, 2005), Vol. II, pp. 253–297.
- Helen Thomas, "Robert Wedderburn and Mulatto Discourse", in Early Black British Writing, ed. Alan Richardson and Debbie Lee (Boston: H Mifflin, 2004), pp. 255–71.
- Helen Thomas, "The Sphinx's Nose and the Decipherment of Culture", in Representations of the Nose in Literature and Art, ed. Helen Thomas, V. de Rijke and Lena Ostermark-Johansen (Middlesex: Middlesex University Press, 2000) pp. 149–168.
- Helen Thomas, Romanticism and Slave Narratives: Transatlantic Testimonies (Cambridge: Cambridge University Press, 2000), 342pp.
- Helen Thomas, "Black on White: Textual Spaces in Black Britain", Wasafiri: Caribbean, African, Asian and Associated Literatures in English, Spring 1999, 5–7.
- Helen Thomas, "The Politics of Reproduction: Pregnancy, Abortion, Infanticide and the Black Female Slave", Gender and Catastrophe, ed. Ronit Lentin (London: Zed Press, 1997), pp. 184–193.
