= Samuel Glasstone =

British-American chemist

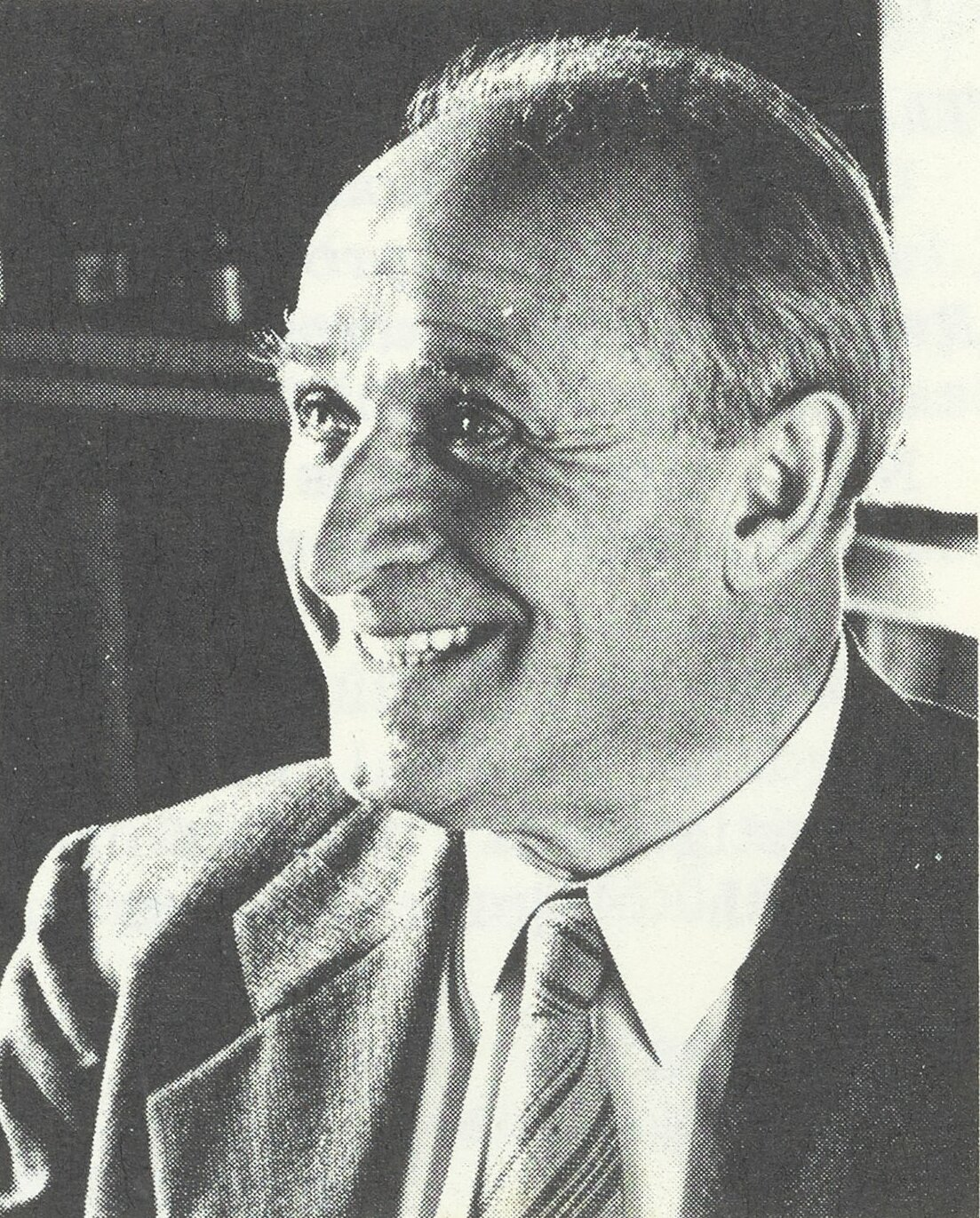
- Born: 3 May 1897; London, England
- Died: 16 November 1986 (aged 89)
- Education: University of London
- Occupations: Author; Physical chemist

Samuel Glasstone (3 May 1897 – 16 November 1986) was a British-born American academic and writer of scientific books. He authored over 40 popular textbooks on physical chemistry and electrochemistry, reaction rates, nuclear weapons effects, nuclear reactor engineering, Mars, space sciences, the environmental effects of nuclear energy and nuclear testing.

== Early life ==
Glasstone was born on 3 May 1897 in London. He received two doctorates, in 1922 and 1926 (PhD and DSc), in chemistry at London University. Glasstone discovered the C–H···O interaction in 1937. After several academic appointments in England, he moved to the US in 1939 and became a naturalized citizen in 1944.

== Career ==
After numerous studies of physical chemistry, for example the discovery of the C–H···O interaction mentioned above, Glasstone worked with Henry Eyring and Keith Laidler on the theory of absolute reaction rates.

He was an accomplished author and consultant to the AEC at the time. Former Atomic Energy Commission (AEC) Chairmain Glenn T. Seaborg wrote:

Over a period of 17 years he has produced for the AEC 12 classical nuclear texts or reference books, each a model in its field. His books ... show what science writing at its best can be – unfairingly correct, but also fluent, lucid, gracesful and superbly organized.

== Publications ==
Popular works are:

- A Textbook of Physical Chemistry (1943)
- Elements of Physical Chemistry (1960)
- Sourcebook on Atomic Energy (1950)
- The Effects of Nuclear Weapons (1950)
- Nuclear Reactor Theory (1970), with George I. Bell
- Controlled Thermonuclear Reactions (1960), with Ralph H. Lovberg
- The Elements of Nuclear Reactor Theory (1953), with Milton C. Edlund
- Principles of Nuclear Reactor Engineering (1963), with Alexander Sesonske

His book The Effects of Nuclear Weapons, has appeared in three editions: 1957, 1962, and 1977 (originally titled The Effects of Atomic Weapons), and documented the effects of nuclear explosions. The 3rd edition was co-authored with Philip J. Dolan.
