= Nick Partridge =

English healthcare activist

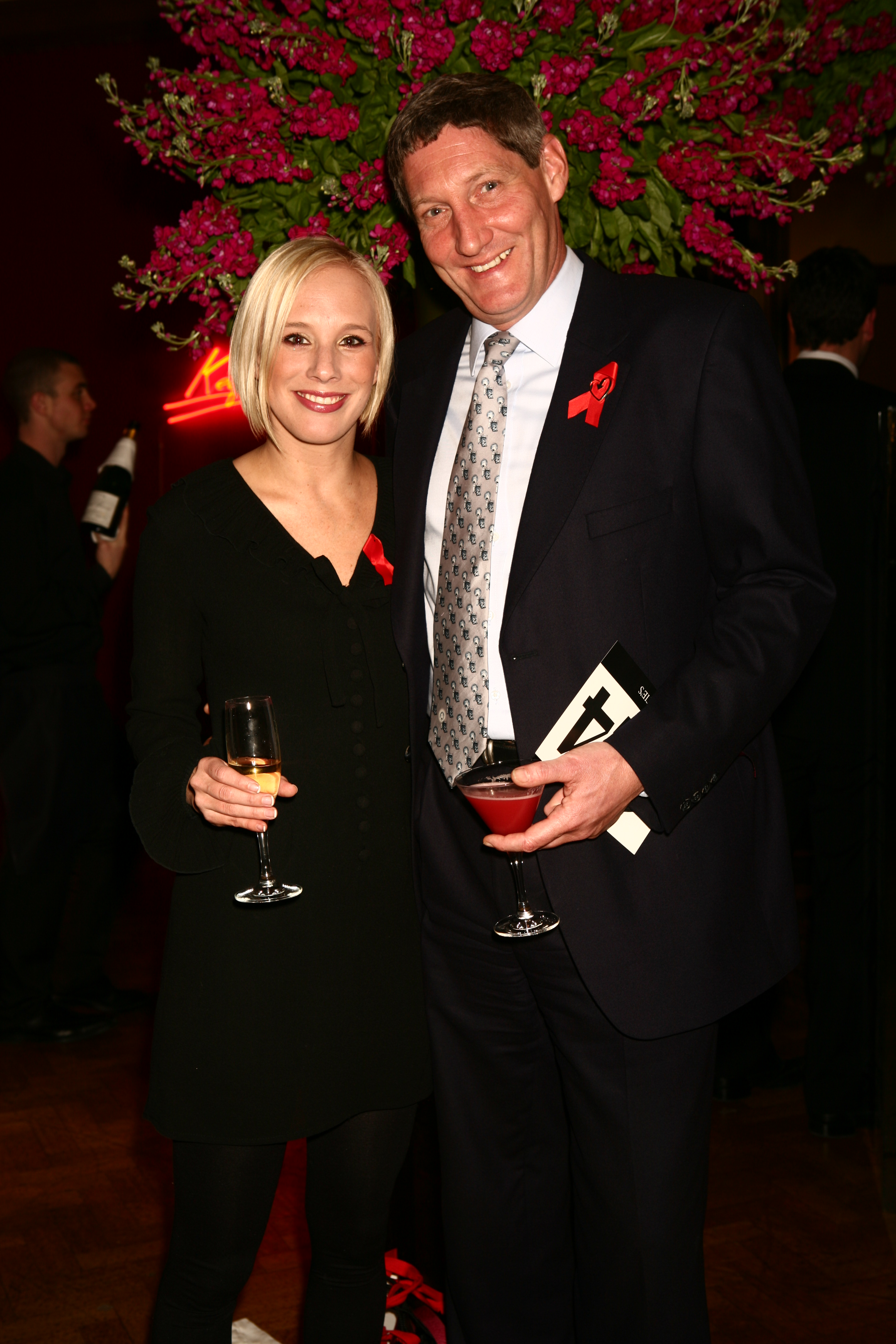
- Photograph of Partridge, with Kirsten O'Brien, from Health and Social Care Information Centre 2013/2014 Annual Report
- Born: Nicholas Wyndham Partridge; 28 August 1955 (age 71); Rickmansworth, southwest Hertfordshire, England
- Occupations: Presenter, activist, businessman
- Years active: 1985–present
- Known for: HIV/AIDS activism
- Partner: Simon Vearnals

Sir Nicholas Wyndham Partridge, OBE (born August 1955), is a British health advocate and public policy leader, best known for his work in HIV/AIDS awareness and for his leadership of the Terrence Higgins Trust, the United Kingdom’s leading HIV and sexual health charity, where he was chief executive from 1991 to 2013.

== Early life and education ==
Partridge was born in Rickmansworth to Miles and Patricia Partridge. He attended West Somerset School in Minehead. He studied international relations at Keele University and graduated with a Bachelor of Arts (BA) degree in 1978.

== Activism ==
Partridge joined the Terrence Higgins Trust in 1985 as the office manager, one of only two full-time paid posts, and became its chief executive in 1991, a role he held for over two decades. Under his leadership, the trust expanded significantly, becoming a national leader in sexual health services, education, advocacy, and policy development. He was instrumental in shifting public attitudes toward HIV and improving services for those affected.

Beyond the Terrence Higgins Trust, Partridge held several influential roles in healthcare governance and research:

- European AIDS Treatment Group (EATG) – founder member (1992). EATG is a patient-led NGO that advocates for the rights and interests of people living with or affected by HIV/AIDS and related co-infections within Europe.
- Commission for Health Improvement – commissioner and deputy chair (1999 to 2004). CHI was responsible for assessing the performance of NHS organizations in England and ensuring the quality of clinical services.
- Healthcare Commission – commissioner and deputy chair (2004–2009). The successor to CHI, the Healthcare Commission was the independent regulator of healthcare in England, responsible for assessing and reporting on the quality and safety of care provided by NHS and private healthcare services.
- INVOLVE – chair (1998–2011). INVOLVE promoted and supported public involvement in health and social care research, aiming to ensure that research is conducted with or by the public rather than to, about, or for them.
- James Lind Alliance – co-founder (2004) with Sir Iain Chalmers and John Scadding. The alliance facilitates the identification of research priorities shared by patients, carers, and clinicians.
- UK Clinical Research Collaboration (UKCRC) – deputy chair (2004–2021). UKCRC worked to establish a more coordinated approach to clinical research and infrastructure development, aiming to make the UK a world leader in health research.
- Clinical Priorities Advisory Group (CPAG) of NHS England – chair (2013–2022). CPAG advises NHS England on which specialized treatments and services should be prioritized for national commissioning.
- Health and Social Care Information Centre (HSCIC) – non-executive director (2013–2016). The HSCIC was the national information and technology delivery organization for health, public health, and social care. In 2016, HSCIC changed its name to NHS Digital.

These roles reflect his broader commitment to evidence-based healthcare, public and patient involvement, and ethical policy development within the NHS and research institutions.

== Honours and recognition ==
Partridge was appointed Officer of the Order of the British Empire (OBE) in 1999 for services to people with HIV and AIDS. He was knighted in the 2009 New Year Honours for his outstanding contributions to healthcare.

He was awarded honorary doctorates from Keele University in 2008 and De Montfort University in 2011.

In 2006, he was declared one of the 100 most influential gay and lesbian people in Britain by The Independent; and in 2010 was ranked 75th (rising from 89th the previous year) in the same list.

== Later work ==
Since stepping down from the Terrence Higgins Trust in 2013, Partridge has continued his involvement in public health, research strategy, and non-profit leadership. His advisory roles have helped shape healthcare policy and research direction, particularly in areas of inclusivity, patient engagement and sexual health.

== Personal life ==
He lives in Peckham, London, with his partner, Simon Vearnals, who is a psychologist. They entered into a civil partnership in 2008.
