= David Harrison (chemical engineer) =

British Chemical Engineer, academic and University administrator (1930–2023)

Sir David Harrison CBE FREng FRSCM FIChemE

Master of Selwyn College, Cambridge
- In office 1994–2000
- Preceded by: Sir Alan Cook
- Succeeded by: Richard Bowring

Vice-Chancellor of University of Exeter
- In office 1984–1994
- Preceded by: Harry Kay
- Succeeded by: Sir Geoffrey Holland

Chair of Committee of UK Vice-Chancellors and Principals
- In office 1991–1993

President of Institution of Chemical Engineers
- In office 1991–1992

Vice-Chancellor of University of Keele
- In office 1979–1984
- Preceded by: W. A. Campbell Stewart
- Succeeded by: Sir Brian Fender

Personal details
- Born: 3 May 1930 Clacton, Essex
- Died: 27 March 2023 (aged 92) Cambridge

Military service
- Allegiance: United Kingdom
- Branch/service: British Army
- Years of service: 1949–1950
- Rank: 2nd lieutenant
- Unit: Royal Electrical and Mechanical Engineers
- Scientific career
- Education: Clacton County High School; Selwyn College, University of Cambridge (BA, PhD)
- Known for: Research into fluidisation; Chairing the UK government's nuclear safety advisory committee
- Spouse: Sheila Rachel Debes
- Children: 3
- Fields: Chemistry, Physical Chemistry, Chemical Engineering
- Institutions: Salters' Institute of Industrial Chemistry (Director, 1993-2015); University of Cambridge; University of Exeter; Keele University
- Thesis: The heat capacities of liquids (1956)
- Notable students: Donald Nicklin; Man Mohan Sharma

Sir David Harrison CBE FREng FRSCM (3 May 1930 – 27 March 2023) was a British chemical engineer and academic. He was vice-chancellor of the University of Keele from 1979 to 1984, vice-chancellor of the University of Exeter from 1984 to 1994, master of Selwyn College, Cambridge, from 1994 to 2000, and pro-vice-chancellor of the University of Cambridge in 1997.

== Early life and education ==
David Harrison was born in Clacton, Essex on 3 May 1930 to Lavinia (née Wilson) and Harold David Harrison. His father, originally from Exeter, was a civil engineer. During World War II, the young David Harrison was evacuated to Sunderland, attending the local Bede School. He attended Clacton County High School upon his return to Essex following the war.

From 1949 to 1950, Harrison completed his national service as a 2nd Lieutenant in the Royal Electrical and Mechanical Engineers. He joined Selwyn College, Cambridge as an undergraduate in 1950 to read natural sciences. Graduating with a double first in 1953, Harrison stayed on at Cambridge to pursue a PhD in physical chemistry. His doctoral research focused on the heat capacities of liquids and was under the supervision of Professor Emyr Alun Moelwyn-Hughes. He received his PhD in 1956.

== Career ==
Fresh out of his PhD, in 1956, Harrison became an assistant lecturer at the newly formed Chemical Engineering Department at Cambridge, headed by Terence Fox. He was promoted to lecturer in 1961 and from 1967 also took on the role of Selwyn College's Senior Tutor, which included responsibility over the college's student admission. In this role, he was remembered for his advocacy for the admission of women to Selwyn, which was a men-only college until 1976. The college master at the time, Owen Chadwick, praised Harrison for handling the transition of Selwyn to a mixed college "without suffering a single resignation from anyone in the process". He was also credited as an early champion of widening participation, building relationships with schools that had not traditionally sent their pupils to Oxbridge to encourage applications from these schools. As admission tutor, Harrison, on occasion, would also be prepared to give contextual offers to applicants from less privileged backgrounds.

During his time at Cambridge, Harrison did extensive research into fluidisation, which resulted in three books written in collaboration with Professor John Davidson. He also had visiting appointments at the Universities of Delaware and Sydney in 1967 and 1976, respectively.

Harrison left Selwyn in 1979 to take up the post of Vice-chancellor at Keele University. In 1984, he took up his second vice-chancellor post at University of Exeter, where he remained until 1994. During his tenure at Exeter, he hosted Archbishop Desmond Tutu as a visiting professor to the university. The South African Archbishop delivered a public lecture at the Great Hall, where he addressed an audience of 2,400 people, calling for sanctions against the Apartheid regime.

Harrison returned to Selwyn in 1994, this time as Master of the college, a role he held until 2000. He was also Cambridge's deputy-vice-chancellor from 1995 to 2000 and served briefly as pro-vice-chancellor in 1997.

Outside academia, he was chairman of the Government's Advisory Committee on the safety of nuclear installations. He chaired the Councils of both Exeter and Ely Cathedrals. Harrison was a governor of numerous schools and Director of the Salters' Institute of Industrial Chemistry from 1993 to 2015, where his focus was the chemistry curriculum and school outreach activities. Between 1996 and 2005 he was Chairman of the Council of the Royal School of Church Music.

== Honours and recognitions ==
Harrison was appointed fellow of Selwyn College in 1957 and honorary fellow of Homerton College in 2016. He also received multiple honorary doctorates:

- Keele University - DUniv (1992)
- University of Exeter - DSc (1995)
- University of York (2008)

He was appointed to fellowships of many learned societies, including the Royal Institute of Chemistry (later the Royal Society of Chemistry) in 1961, the Institution of Chemical Engineers in 1968, Royal Society of Arts in 1985, and Royal Academy of Engineering in 1987.

Harrison received a CBE in the 1990 New Year Honours. He was knighted in the 1997 New Year Honours for services to education and nuclear safety.

== Personal life ==
In 1962, Harrison married Sheila Rachel Debes, who was a teacher. They had a daughter and two sons (by one of whom he was predeceased).

Harrison was a member of The Athenaeum and Oxford and Cambridge Club. He organised a highly publicised boycott of the latter in 1995 due to its policy of excluding women from membership as well as the club's facilities. Due to the pressure from this campaign, the club started admitting women to its membership in 1996.

Harrison died on 27 March 2023, aged 92, at his home in Cambridge. His funeral took place at Selwyn College Chapel on 20 April 2023. A memorial service celebrating Harrison's legacy was organised by Selwyn College on 21 October the same year.

== Legacy and commemoration ==
Harrison House and Harrison Drive in Homerton College, University of Cambridge are named after Harrison, marking his service as chair of the Trustees of Homerton College until 2010 when it received its Royal Charter and became self-governing. The Senior Common Room at Selwyn College was renamed the Harrison Room on Harrison's 90th birthday in 2020. He is also the namesake of the Harrison Building at the University of Exeter.

Following Harrison's death in 2023, Selwyn College created The Sir David Harrison Fund in memory of its alumnus and former master, with the aim to support the teaching and learning of science at the college. The endowment funds a teaching fellowship as well as a Master's scholarship.

British Guyanese writer David Dabydeen dedicated his 2024 novel, Sweet Li Jie, to Harrison, who was Admission Tutor when Dabydeen matriculated at Selwyn College in 1974.

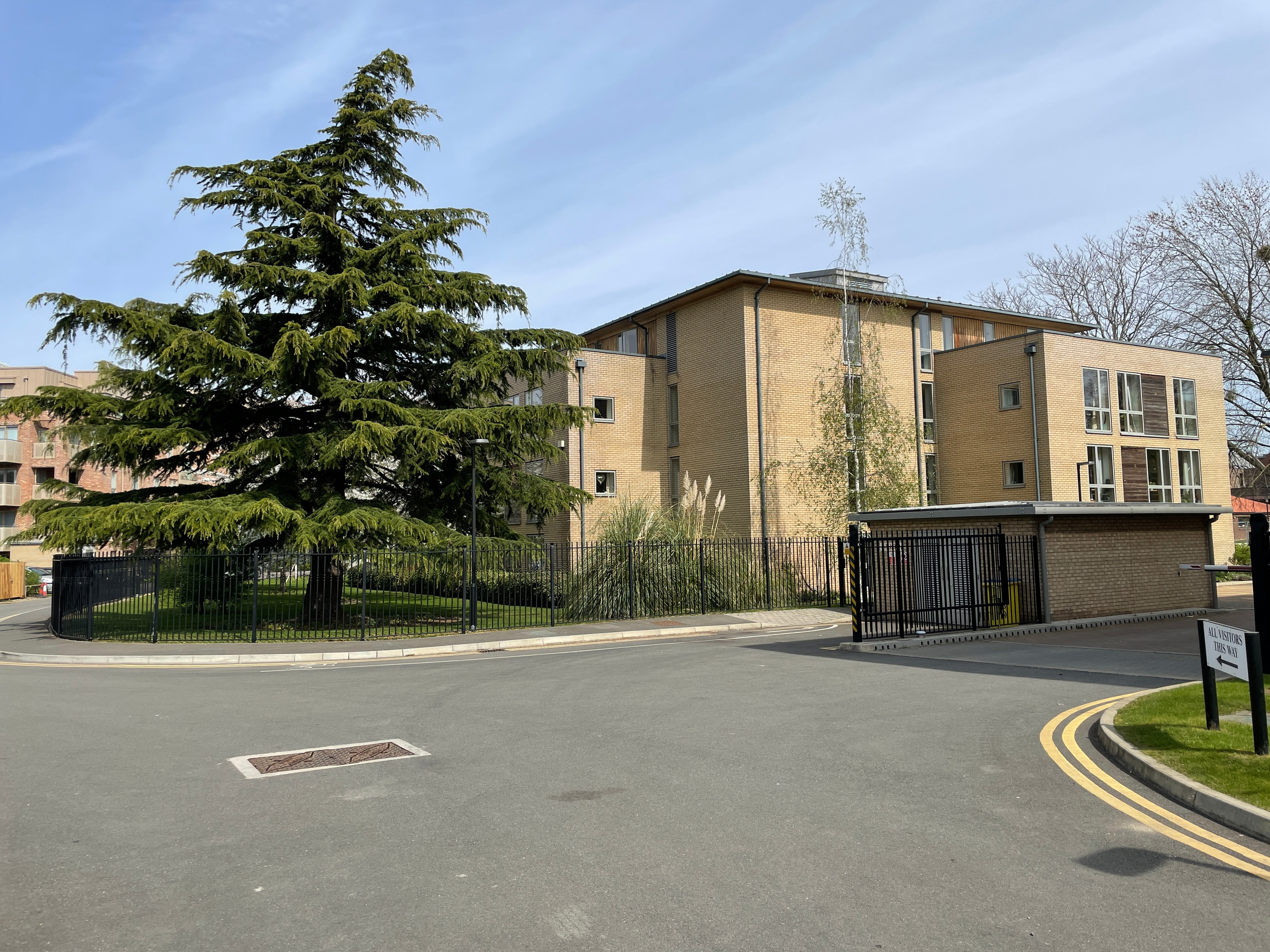
Harrison House, Homerton College, Cambridge

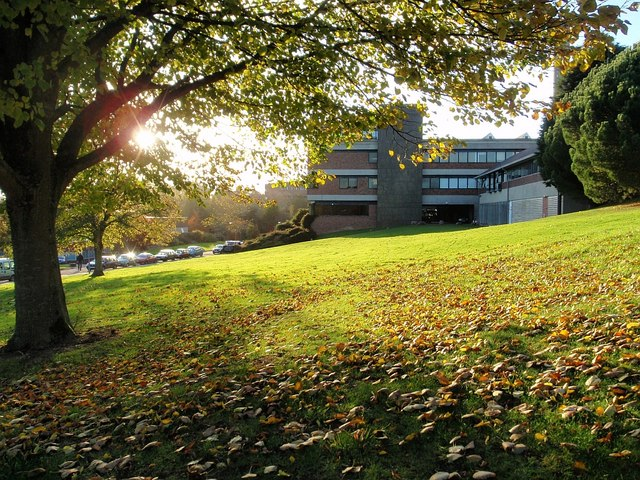
Harrison building, University of Exeter

Academic offices
Preceded by Professor W. A. Campbell Stewart	Vice-Chancellor of Keele University; 1979–1984	Succeeded by Professor Sir Brian Fender
Preceded by Professor Harry Kay	Vice-Chancellor of the University of Exeter; 1984–1994	Succeeded by Sir Geoffrey Holland
Preceded by Sir Alan Cook	Master of Selwyn College, Cambridge; 1994–2000	Succeeded by Professor Richard Bowring
