= Ernest Gordon Cox =

British crystallographer & structural chemist (1906-1996)

Sir (Ernest) Gordon Cox TD KBE FRS (24 April 1906 – 23 June 1996) was a British crystallographer and structural chemist. He was the father of the British geologist Keith Gordon Cox.

== Early life and education ==
Cox was born in Twerton, Somerset on 24 April 1906. He was the son of Ernest Henry Cox (1884–1987), a market gardener, and his wife Rosina Ring. He was educated at the City of Bath Boys' School and then read physics at the University of Bristol, graduating in 1927. He was awarded the degree of DSc by Bristol in 1936.

== Early academic career ==
In 1927 Cox joined the team led by Professor Sir William Bragg FRS in the Davy-Faraday Laboratory at the Royal Institution in London where he worked on x-ray measurements of crystalline structures. In 1929 he moved to the Department of Chemistry at the University of Birmingham, eventually being promoted to Reader in Chemical Crystallography in 1941.

== War years ==
Cox joined the Territorial Army in 1936, but for the early war years remained at Birmingham to work on explosives. In 1942 he became Senior Officer in charge of the laboratories of the Inter-Services Research Bureau (ISRB), which was a cover name for the Special Operations Executive (SOE). In 1944-45 he was in France and Belgium on special duties as a Lieutenant-Colonel undertaking liaison with the French and Belgian Resistance.

== Later academic career ==
In 1945 Cox was appointed Professor of Inorganic and Structural Chemistry at the University of Leeds. He remained at Leeds until 1960 when he became Secretary of the Agricultural Research Council (ARC). Cox retired from the ARC in 1971.

== Honours ==
Cox received the Territorial Decoration (TD) in 1949 and was knighted (as a Knight Commander of the Order of the British Empire (KBE)) in 1964. He was elected a Fellow of the Royal Society (FRS) in 1954.

Cox received the following honorary degrees:

- DSc, Newcastle University, 1964
- DSc, University of Birmingham, 1964
- LLD, University of Bristol, 1969
- DSc, University of Bath, 1973
- DSc, University of East Anglia, 1973

== Marriages and children ==
Cox married his childhood sweetheart, Lucie Baker, in 1929. They had a son and a daughter. Lucie died in 1962 and in 1968 Cox married Professor Mary Rosaleen "Jackie" Truter (nee Jackman) (subsequently Lady Cox), a former Leeds colleague and by then Deputy Director of the ARC Unit of Structural Chemistry at University College London. Lady Cox was born in 1925 and died on 26 November 2004.

== Death ==
Cox died in Hampstead, London on 23 June 1996 at the age of 90.
