= Brian Fender =

English academic executive

Sir Brian Edward Frederick Fender, CMG (born 15 September 1934) is an English academic executive.

== Career ==
Fender was Chief Executive of the Higher Education Funding Council for England from 1995 to 2001. Prior to that he was Vice-Chancellor of Keele University (1985–95), Associate Director and Director of the Institut Laue-Langevin in Grenoble, France and Chairman of the Science Board of the UK's Science and Engineering Research Council. He is a graduate and Fellow of Imperial College.

Sir Brian is currently a member of the University Grants Committee, Hong Kong, President of the National Foundation for Educational Research, Chairman of the National Council for Drama Training and a Director of Higher Aims Ltd, a private consultancy involved in higher education and research management. Sir Brian is a Fellow of the Institute of Physics, the Royal Society of Chemistry and a Companion of the Chartered Management Institute. He has honorary degrees or fellowships from eleven universities and colleges.

In 2005 Fender was appointed the first chairman and President of the Institute of Knowledge Transfer.

== Early life ==
Fender was born in Barrow-in-Furness, and lived in the Eden Valley until 1949. He attended Carlisle Grammar School and Sale County Grammar School.

== Personal life ==
Fender has been married twice, and has a son and three daughters.

Academic offices
Preceded by Sir David Harrison	Vice-Chancellor, Keele University; 1985-95	Succeeded by Professor Dame Janet Finch
