= W. A. Campbell Stewart =

British professor (1915–1997)

William Alexander Campbell Stewart (17 December 1915 – 23 April 1997) was a professor of education and vice-chancellor of Keele University.

== Early life ==
Stewart was born in Glasgow but brought up in London where he attended Colfe's Grammar School (1927–34) and University College London (1934–38) where he obtained a BA degree in English. He obtained a PhD in 1947 from the University of London on which he later based a book, The Quakers and Education.

== Career ==
He was housemaster at the Friends School, Saffron Walden from 1938 to 1943 and then moved to Abbotsholme School, Derbyshire from 1943 to 1944. He lectured in education at University College, Nottingham (now the University of Nottingham) and at the University of Wales in Cardiff from 1944 to 1950. In 1950 Lord Lindsay, the founder of the newly opened University College of North Staffordshire, (now Keele University), appointed him the Chair of Education in 1950. At Keele he built up the department and later the Institute of Education. He became Acting Principal at Keele after the death of Sir George Barnes in 1960. In fact Keele's first three principals had all died in office.

In 1967, after the college had gained university status in 1962, he became Vice-Chancellor, a position he held until 1979.

After retiring he lived in Sussex and had an Honorary Visiting Professorial Fellowship at the University of Sussex. In 1989 he completed and published a survey on Higher Education in Postwar Britain.

== Personal life ==
In 1947 Stewart married Elizabeth (Ella) Burnett, a practising Quaker, and had one son and one daughter. In 1954 he contracted polio, which left him with a permanently paralysed left arm. He died following a car accident on a return visit to Keele. His funeral was held in the university chapel.

== Publications ==
- The Quakers and Education 1953; Facsimile edition 1971 ISBN 978 0804611213
- The Educational Innovators, two volumes, 1967–68; Publisher: Macmillan
- Higher Education in Post-War Britain 1989

Academic offices
Preceded by Dr Harold McCarter Taylor	Vice-Chancellor, Keele University; 1967-79	Succeeded by Sir David Harrison
