= Giles Hooper =

British musicologist (born 1974)

- Born: 1974 (age 51–52)

Education
- Education: University of Liverpool

Philosophical work
- Era: 21st-century philosophy
- Region: Critical Musicology
- School: Critical Theory, New Musicology
- Main interests: Critical Musicology · Aesthetics; Philosophy of Music; Philosophy of mind · Postmodernism
- Notable works: The Discourse of Musicology

Giles Hooper is an author and lecturer at the University of Liverpool. He is known for contributions to contemporary musicology and applications of postmodernist theory in musicology.

Hooper completed his PhD, The study of music and the status of musical knowledge, at the University of Keele in 2003. After teaching at Keele, Exeter, and Bristol, he was appointed as a lecturer in the School of Music in 2005. Hooper's work is currently in wide-ranging research interests including twentieth-century music, critical theory and analysis. In 2010, Hooper was appointed Head of the School of Music. His best known publication is "The Discourse of Musicology" published in 2006.

== Publications ==
- The Discourse of Musicology (Ashgate Publishing, June 2006) ISBN 0-7546-5211-4
- Nevermind Nirvana: A post-Adornian perspective. International Review of the Aesthetics and Sociology of Music, 38 (1).
- An incomplete project: Modernism, formalism and the 'music itself'
