= New Zealand Institute of Chemistry =

New Zealand professional organization supporting chemical sciences

The New Zealand Institute of Chemistry (NZIC) was founded in 1931 and is the professional membership organisation for professionals working in the field of chemistry across the education and industry sectors in New Zealand. It is organised into six geographical branches (Auckland, Waikato, Manawatu, Wellington, Canterbury, and Otago) and a number of specialist groups.

In 2019 it formed the group Secondary Chemistry Educators of NZ (SCENZ) as the national chemistry teachers’ subject association.

The NZIC publishes its own quarterly journal Chemistry in New Zealand. It has been a co-owner society of Chemistry: An Asian Journal since 2008, and is a co-owner of Physical Chemistry Chemical Physics published by the Royal Society of Chemistry (UK). The NZIC holds a national conference every two years with the branches taking turns to host. It is also a co-sponsor of the Pacifichem Congress which is held in Hawaii every five years.

The Council of the NZIC consists of an Executive (President, Vice President or Past President and Treasurer), Student Representative, Secretary, and delegates from each of the Branch Committees. Members of the executive are elected annually at the Annual General Meeting.

== Affiliations ==
The NZIC is a member of the Federation of Asian Chemical Societies (FACS) and a constituent organisation of Royal Society Te Apārangi.

== Membership ==
Currently there are four categories of membership: Member (including Student Member), Fellow, Honorary Fellow (the highest honour of the NZIC), and school member. A member of the New Zealand Institute of Chemistry is designated with the honorific affix "MNZIC". As the professional body for chemistry in New Zealand, the Institute can promote a member to Fellow of the institute ("FNZIC"). This requires a minimum of 5 years’ professional experience as a Member, and the candidate must have shown a substantial measure of ability or achievement in chemistry.

== Notable people ==
Sarah Masters (past president)
