= List of University of Exeter people =

This is a list of University of Exeter people, including office holders, current and former academics, and alumni of the University of Exeter.

In post-nominals, the University of Exeter is abbreviated as Exon. (from the Latin Exoniensis), and is the suffix given to honorary and academic degrees from the university.

== Chancellors ==
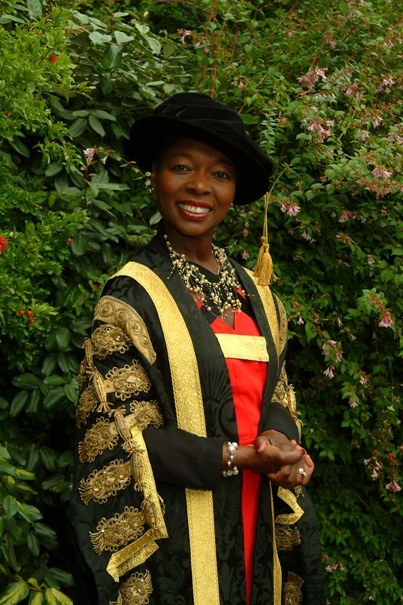
Floella Benjamin, Baroness Benjamin, Chancellor of the university (2006-2016)

- Mary Cavendish, Duchess of Devonshire (1955–1972)
- Derick Heathcoat-Amory, 1st Viscount Amory of Tiverton (1972–1981)
- Sir Rex Richards (1982–1998)
- Robert Alexander, Baron Alexander of Weedon (1998–2005)
- Floella Benjamin, Baroness Benjamin (2006–2016)
- Paul Myners, Baron Myners (2016–2021)
- Sir Michael Barber (2022-)

== Vice-chancellors ==
Principals of the University College of the South West of England

- Arthur W. Clayden (1893-1920)
- Hector Hetherington (1920-1924)
- Walter Hamilton Moberly (1925–1926)
- John Murray (1926–1951)
- Sir Thomas Taylor (1952–1953)
- Sir James Cook (1954–1955); final Principal, first Vice-Chancellor

Vice-chancellors of the University of Exeter

- Sir James Cook (1955–1966); former Principal, first Vice-Chancellor,
- Sir John Llewellyn (1966–1972)
- Harry Kay (1973–1984)
- Sir David Harrison (1984–1994)
- Sir Geoffrey Holland (1994–2002)
- Sir Steve Smith (2002–2020)
- Professor Lisa Roberts (2020-)

== Notable academics ==
- Richard Acland, Education
- John Adair, Management (Leadership)
- Omar Ashour, Middle East Studies
- Manuel Barange, Biosciences
- Barry Barnes, Sociology
- Jeremy Black, History
- Barbara Borg, Classical Archaeology
- Peter Cox, Climatology
- Adam Curle, Psychology and Education
- Adrian Currie, Philosophy
- Uri Davis, Middle East Studies
- John Dupré, Philosophy
- John Endler, Animal Behaviour
- Edzard Ernst, Complementary Medicine
- Timothy Gorringe, Theology
- Alex Haslam, Psychology
- Philip Hensher, Creative Writing
- Ghada Karmi, Middle East Studies
- Paul Kline, Psychology
- Tim Lenton, Climatology
- William Lewis, Chemistry
- Alastair Logan, Theology
- Linda Long, Biochemistry
- Richard Lynn, Psychology
- Colin MacCabe, Film Studies
- Moelwyn Merchant, English
- Gerd Nonneman, Middle East Studies
- Richard Overy, History
- Ilan Pappe, Middle East Studies
- Philip Payton, Cornish Studies
- David Rees, Pure Mathematics
- Nicholas Rodger, History
- Roy Sambles, Physics
- Richard Seaford, Classics
- Dikran Tahta, Mathematics educator
- Nick Talbot, FRS, Molecular genetics
- Andrew Thorpe, History
- Malcolm Todd, History
- Sir John Tooke, Medicine
- Garry Tregidga, History
- Paul Webley, Psychology
- Canon Vernon White, Theology (Lecturer and Lazenby Chaplain)
- Michael Winter, Politics
- Ted Wragg, Education

== Notable alumni ==
=== Academics ===
- Sir Michael Berry - mathematical physicist, known for the Berry Phase and recipient of the Ig Nobel Prize for using magnets to levitate a frog
- Iwona Blazwick - art critic and lecturer
- Stephen J. Ceci - cognitive psychologist - PhD Psychology (1978)
- Imogen Coe - biochemist and Dean of Toronto Metropolitan University
- Rose Ferraby - archaeologist and artist
- Andrew D. Hamilton - former vice-chancellor of the University of Oxford, current president of New York University
- Ally Louks - literary academic
- David Maguire - Vice-Chancellor of the University of East Anglia
- Sami Moubayed - historian and writer
- Namira Nahouza - French author, academic researcher, university lecturer, teacher of Arabic and religious studies, and research fellow at Cambridge Muslim College
- Rachel Owen - photographer, printmaker and lecturer on medieval Italian literature
- Shams Rahman - 6th vice-chancellor of East West University
- Raymond St. Leger - mycologist, entomologist and molecular biologist
- Sir William Wakeham - former vice-chancellor of Southampton University

=== Actors and directors ===
- Samantha Baines - actress and comedian
- Phil Cameron - theatre producer
- Adam Campbell - actor
- Steven Culp - actor
- Stephen Dillane - actor
- Michael Garner - actor
- Andrew Havill - actor
- Nick Hendrix - actor
- Vanessa Kirby - actress
- Jeremy Meadow - theatre director/producer
- Nicholas Pegg - actor/director
- Julian Richings - actor
- Christopher Smith - American actor and improviser
- Elaine Tan - actress

=== Business people ===
- George Hobart-Hampden, 10th Earl of Buckinghamshire - former HSBC executive
- Rachel Burnett - IT lawyer, author and president of the British Computer Society
- Phil Cameron - owner of No.1 Traveller
- Dennis Gillings - founder of the Fortune 500 company Quintiles
- Sam E. Jonah - president of AngloGold Ashanti
- Toki Mabogunje founder, Toki Mabogunje & Co and the 3rd female president Lagos Chamber of Commerce (LCCI)
- Henry Staunton - media mogul
- Neil Woodford - founder and CEO, Woodford Investment Management

=== Entertainers and journalists ===
- Toby Amies - TV presenter, film-maker
- Katy Ashworth - children's TV chef
- Emma B - radio presenter
- Steve Backshall - BBC television presenter
- Nick Baker - wildlife TV expert
- William Bemister - Emmy award-winning documentary filmmaker and journalist
- Raef Bjayou - former contestant on BBC's The Apprentice
- Alison Booker - radio DJ
- John Crace - Guardian features writer
- Tom Deacon - comedian and Radio 1 DJ
- Tim Footman - journalist and author
- Daphne Fowler - game show champion, winner of Fifteen to One, Going for Gold, and Brain of Britain
- Frank Gardner - BBC security correspondent
- Alex George - contestant on season 4 of Love Island UK
- Rhod Gilbert - comedian
- Frank Gillard - broadcaster and BBC executive
- Simon Greenberg - Chelsea FC's Director of Communications
- Lloyd Griffith - comedian, actor and classical singer
- Isabel Hardman - assistant editor of The Spectator
- Stefano Hatfield - former editor of the i
- Lindsey Hilsum - Channel 4 journalist and international editor
- Katie Hopkins - presenter and former contestant on BBC's The Apprentice
- Paul Jackson - television producer
- Jon Kay - television presenter and journalist
- Raph Korine - Runner-up, Big Brother UK 2017
- Ted Kravitz - Formula 1 commentator
- Mark Labbett - Professional quizzer and TV personality on The Chase
- Tim Montgomerie - editor of ConservativeHome
- Clemmie Moodie - Daily Mirror associate features editor
- James Pearce - journalist and presenter for BBC Sport
- Mark Power - journalist and photographer
- Tim Taylor - creator and producer of Channel 4's series Time Team
- Rob Walker - British sports commentator, television presenter and freelance reporter
- Matthew Wright - TV presenter of The Wright Stuff

=== Judges, lawyers and law enforcement ===
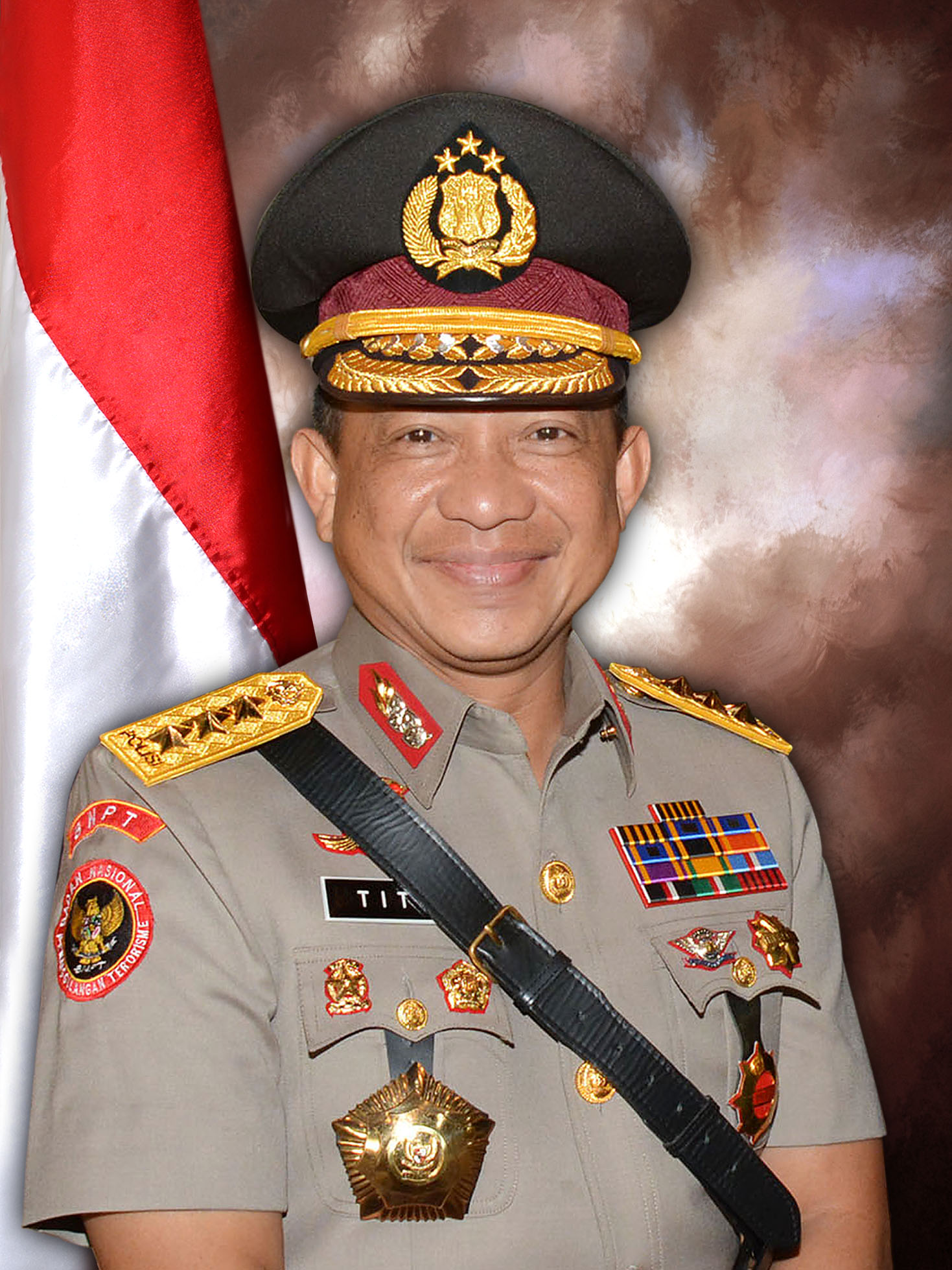
Chief of Indonesian Police Gen. Tito Karnavian studied MA Police Studies in 1993

- Patrick Kwateng Acheampong - Inspector General of Police of the Ghana Police Service - MA Police Studies and Criminal Justice (1990)
- Steve Edge - Partner at Slaughter and May
- Sir Patrick Elias - Lord Justice of Appeal - LLB (1969)
- Sir John Goldring - Lord Justice of Appeal, and member of the Judicial Appointments Commission
- Tito Karnavian - Current Indonesian National Police chief - MA Police Studies (1993)
- Sir Robert Michael Owen - High Court Judge
- George L. Savvides - Attorney General of the Republic of Cyprus
- Fiona Shackleton - high-profile divorce lawyer
- Ambiga Sreenevasan - former president of the Malaysian Bar Council and human rights activist
- David Syed - Head of Sovereign Practice at Dentons Europe
- Jeremy Wright - Attorney General for England and Wales

=== Military personnel ===
- Admiral Sir Jonathon Band, formerly the First Sea Lord chief of the Naval Staff (head of the Royal Navy)
- Lieutenant Colonel Lucy Giles, first female College Commander at the Royal Military Academy Sandhurst commanding New College.
- Major General Matthew Holmes, former Commandant General Royal Marines.
- General Sir Patrick Sanders, Chief of the General Staff.

=== Musicians ===
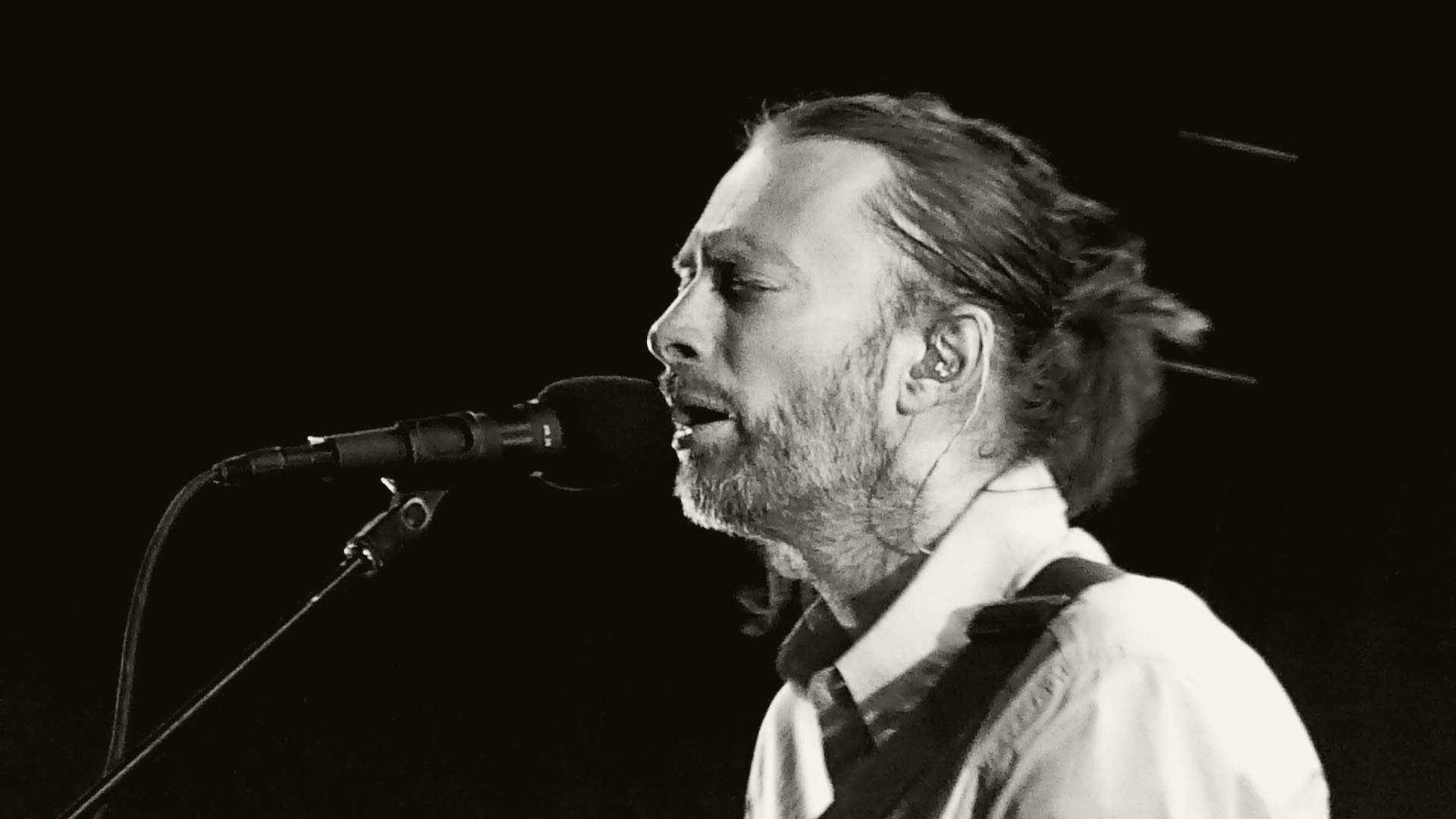
Thom Yorke, singer

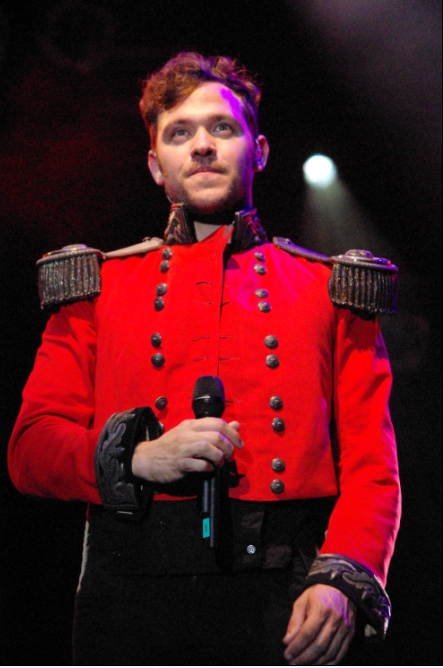
Will Young, singer

- Felix Buxton of Basement Jaxx
- Anthony Drewe - lyricist
- Matthew Herbert - electronic musician
- Hannah Kendall - composer
- Tony McManus - guitarist
- Jackie Oates - folk star and multiple BBC Radio 2 Folk Awards winner
- Simon Shackleton - electronic musician
- George Stiles - composer
- Thom Yorke - singer Radiohead
- Will Young - singer and actor
- Call Me Loop - singer and songwriter
- Principal Edwards Magic Theatre - performance artists of the 1960s/70s
- Members of Semi-Toned - all-male A cappella group, winner of Gareth Malone's BBC 2 series The Choir: Gareth's Best in Britain

=== Politicians ===
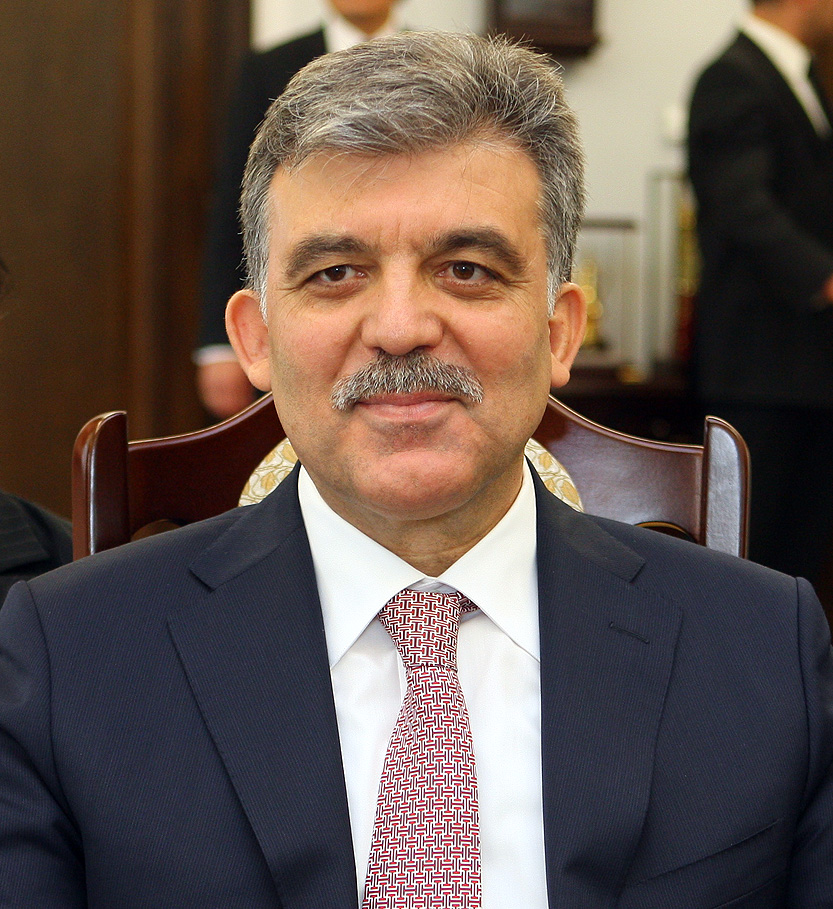
Abdullah Gül, former President of Turkey

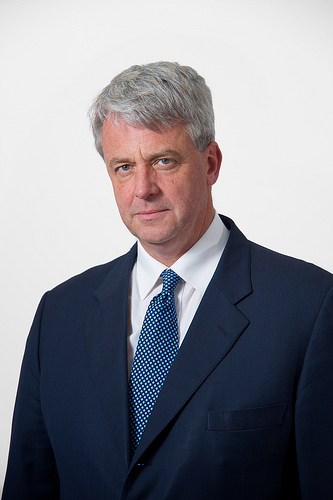
Andrew Lansley, MP

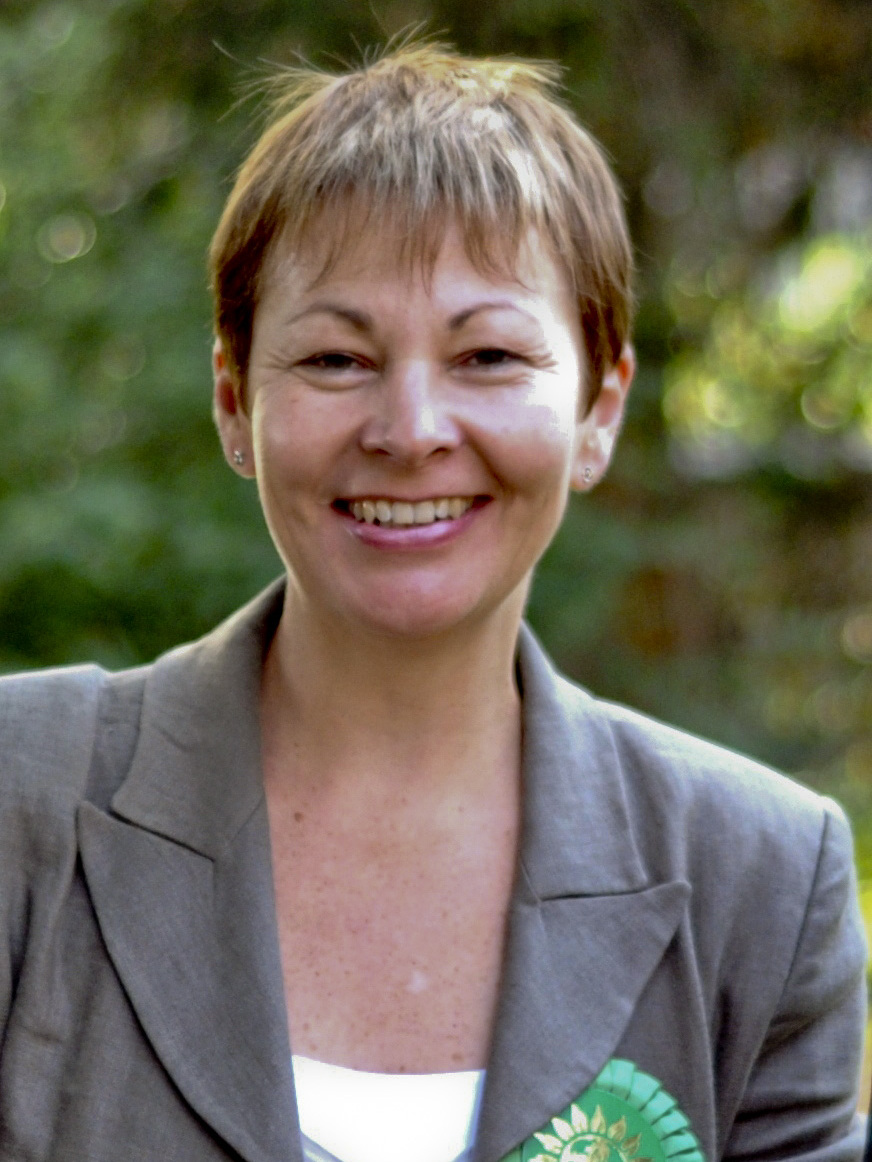
Caroline Lucas, MP and former leader of the Green Party

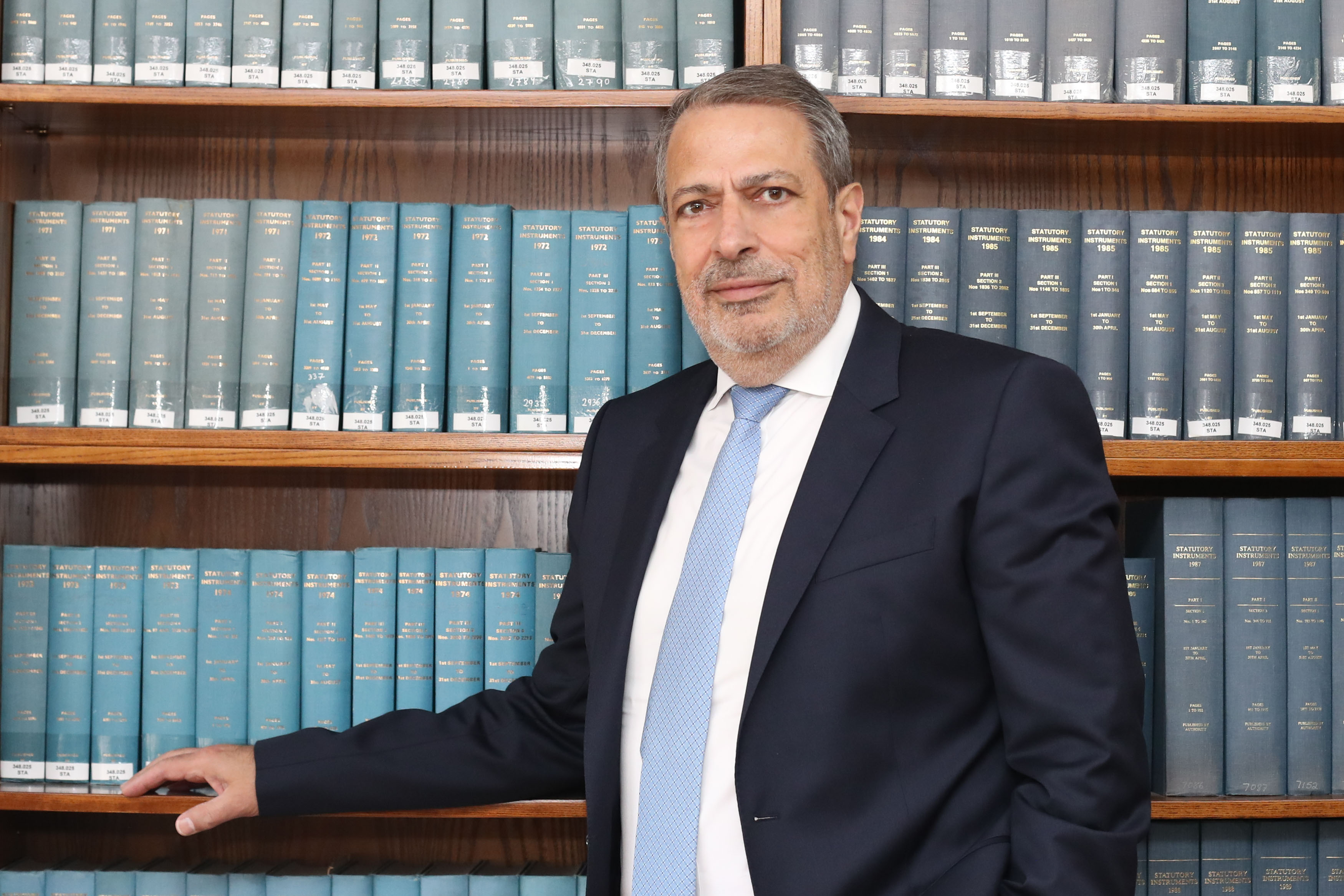
George L. Savvides, Attorney-General of the Republic of Cyprus and former Minister of Justice and Public Order

- Nana Ama Dokua Asiamah Adjei - Member of the Ghanaian Parliament and Deputy Minister of Information
- Nickie Aiken - Conservative MP
- Tonia Antoniazzi - Labour MP
- Tengku Zafrul Aziz - Malaysian Minister of Finance
- Adrian Bailey - Labour MP
- James Brokenshire - Secretary of State for Housing, Communities and Local Government
- David Burrowes - Conservative MP
- Esra Limbacher - Member of the German federal Parliament Bundestag
- Martin Cauchon - former Minister of Justice in Canada
- Derek Clark - UKIP MEP
- Feryal Clark - Labour MP
- Major James Coldwell - former MP and leader of the Co-operative Commonwealth Federation party in Canada.
- Mark Drakeford - First Minister of Wales
- Michael Frendo - Foreign Minister of Malta
- Zewde Gebre-Sellassie - former Deputy Prime Minister of Ethiopia and Minister of Foreign Affairs
- Carl Barrington Greenidge - Former Vice President and Minister of Foreign Affairs of Guyana
- Kate Griffiths - Conservative MP
- Abdullah Gül - former President of Turkey (2007–14)
- Ameenah Gurib - President of Mauritius
- Vilmundur Gylfason - former Icelandic politician, historian and poet
- Robert Halfon - Conservative MP and Deputy Chairperson
- Philip Ian Hope - Labour MP and vocational education minister
- Moussa Ibrahim - spokesman for Gaddafi during the 2011 Libyan civil war
- Bernadette Jagger - Member of the Namibian Parliament and Deputy Minister of Environment and Tourism
- Sajid Javid - Former Chancellor of the Exchequer (2019–2020)
- Sigrid Kaag - Dutch politician and Minister
- Luay al-Khatteeb - Former Minister of Electricity of Iraq
- Jonathan Kwesi Lamptey - Former Deputy Prime Minister and Minister of Defence of Ghana
- Mark Lancaster - Conservative MP
- Andrew Lansley - Former MP and Former Secretary of State for Health
- Lau Kong Wah - Secretary for Home Affairs of Hong Kong.
- Caroline Lucas - MP and former Co-Leader of the Green Party of England and Wales
- Gabriel Makhlouf - Governor of the Central Bank of Ireland and Former Secretary to the New Zealand Treasury
- Anthony Mangnall - Member of UK Parliament
- Eliud Mathu - First African member of the Legislative Council of Kenya
- Linah Mohohlo - Governor of the Bank of Botswana
- Hind Abdul Rahman al-Muftah - Member of the Qatari Consultative Assembly
- Prem Nababsing - Former Deputy Prime Minister of Mauritius
- Jonny Oates - Chief of Staff to the Deputy Prime Minister, Nick Clegg
- Pieter Omtzigt - Member of the Dutch House of Representatives
- Park Jae-kyu - former Unification Minister and National Security Council Chairman of South Korea
- Roy Perry - Conservative Politician and former MEP
- Álvaro Santos Pereira - Former Minister of Economy, Labour, Transport, Public Works and Communications of Portugal
- Luke Pollard - Labour MP
- George L. Savvides - former Minister of Justice and Public Order of the Republic of Cyprus
- Abubakar Boniface Siddique - Member of the Ghanaian Parliament and Minister of State
- Mehmet Simsek - Deputy Prime Minister of Turkey, Minister of Finance (2009–2015)
- Andy Slaughter - Labour MP
- Iain Stewart - Conservative MP for Milton Keynes South
- Abdullah Omran Taryam - First UAE Minister of Justice and Minister of Education, and founder of the newspapers Al Khaleej and Gulf Today
- Robin Teverson - Liberal Democrat MEP and Peer
- Abdirahman Ahmed Ali Tuur - 1st president of Somaliland (1991-1993)
- Jeremy Wright - Attorney General
- Derek Wyatt - Labour MP
- Ahmed Zaki Yamani - former Minister of Petroleum and Mineral Resources in Saudi Arabia
- Yip Hon Weng - Member of the Parliament of Singapore
- Óscar Iván Zuluaga - nominee for President of Colombia in the 2014 election

=== Religion ===
- Ammar Nakshawani
- Metropolitan Seraphim of Glastonbury - head of the British Orthodox Church
- James Stuart Jones - Bishop of Liverpool - Theology (1970)
- Peter Smith - Archbishop-emeritus of Southwark, vice-president of the Bishops Conference of England and Wales
- Sadiq Al-Ghariani - Grand Mufti of Libya
- Andrew Williams - bishop of the Anglican Diocese in New England

=== Royalty ===
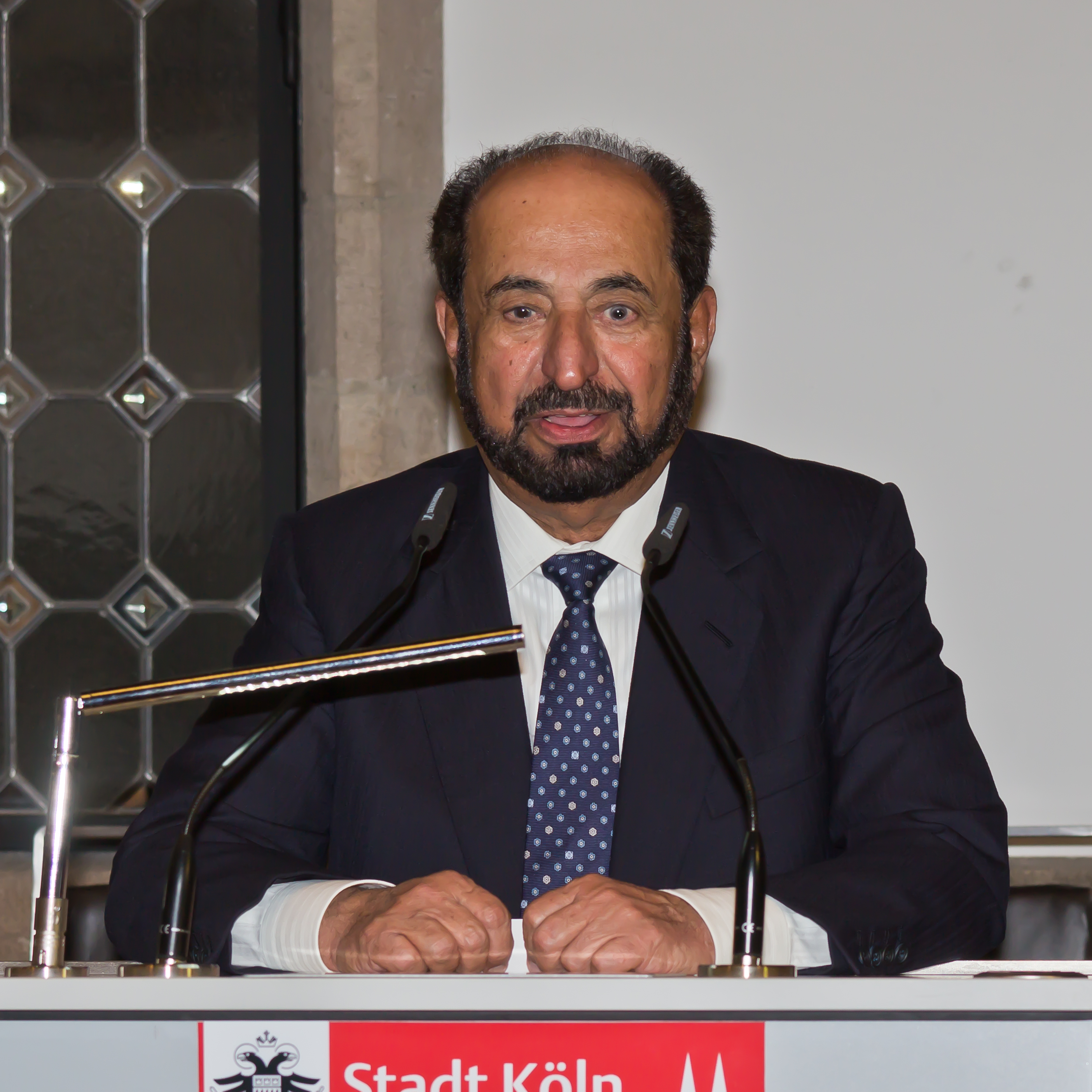
Sultan bin Muhammad Al-Qasimi

- Sultan bin Muhammad Al-Qasimi - ruler of Sharjah - PhD History (1985)
- Infanta Elena of Spain - eldest daughter of King Juan Carlos and Queen Sofía - MA Sociology and Education - (1990)
- Peter Phillips - eldest grandson and first grandchild of Queen Elizabeth II and the Duke of Edinburgh - Sport Science (2000)
- Zara Phillips - eldest granddaughter of Queen Elizabeth II - Physiotherapy

=== Sports people ===
- Tom Abell - Somerset cricketer
- Mark Bamford - former cricketer
- Andy Beattie - England rugby player
- Richard Capstick - Exeter Chiefs rugby player
- Ben Collins, Formula 3 racing driver, who appeared in Top Gear as the Stig
- Richard Dawson - Yorkshire and England cricketer
- Paul Downton - former England cricketer
- Richard Ellison - former Kent and England cricketer
- Immanuel Feyi-Waboso - Exeter Chiefs and England national team rugby player
- Richard Hill - former England rugby captain
- Lasha Jaiani - Georgian national team rugby player
- Dafydd Jenkins - Exeter Chiefs rugby player and Wales national team captain
- Pete Laverick - Exeter Chiefs rugby player
- Tom Lawday - Harlequins rugby player
- Jack Maunder - Exeter Chiefs rugby player
- Sam Maunder - Exeter Chiefs rugby player
- John Scott - former England national team rugby player
- Henry Slade - Exeter Chiefs and England national team rugby player
- Sam Skinner - Exeter Chiefs and Scotland national team rugby player
- Samantha Smith - tennis player and commentator
- David Sole - former Scottish rugby captain
- Jeff Squire - former Lions and Wales national team rugby player
- Tom Stayt - cricketer
- Arul Suppiah - Malaysia and Somerset cricketer
- Christ Tshiunza - Exeter Chiefs and Wales national team rugby player
- Gerald Trump - cricketer and schoolteacher
- Ross Vintcent - Exeter Chiefs and Italian national team rugby player
- Matthew Wheeler - former Northamptonshire cricketer

=== Writers and artists ===
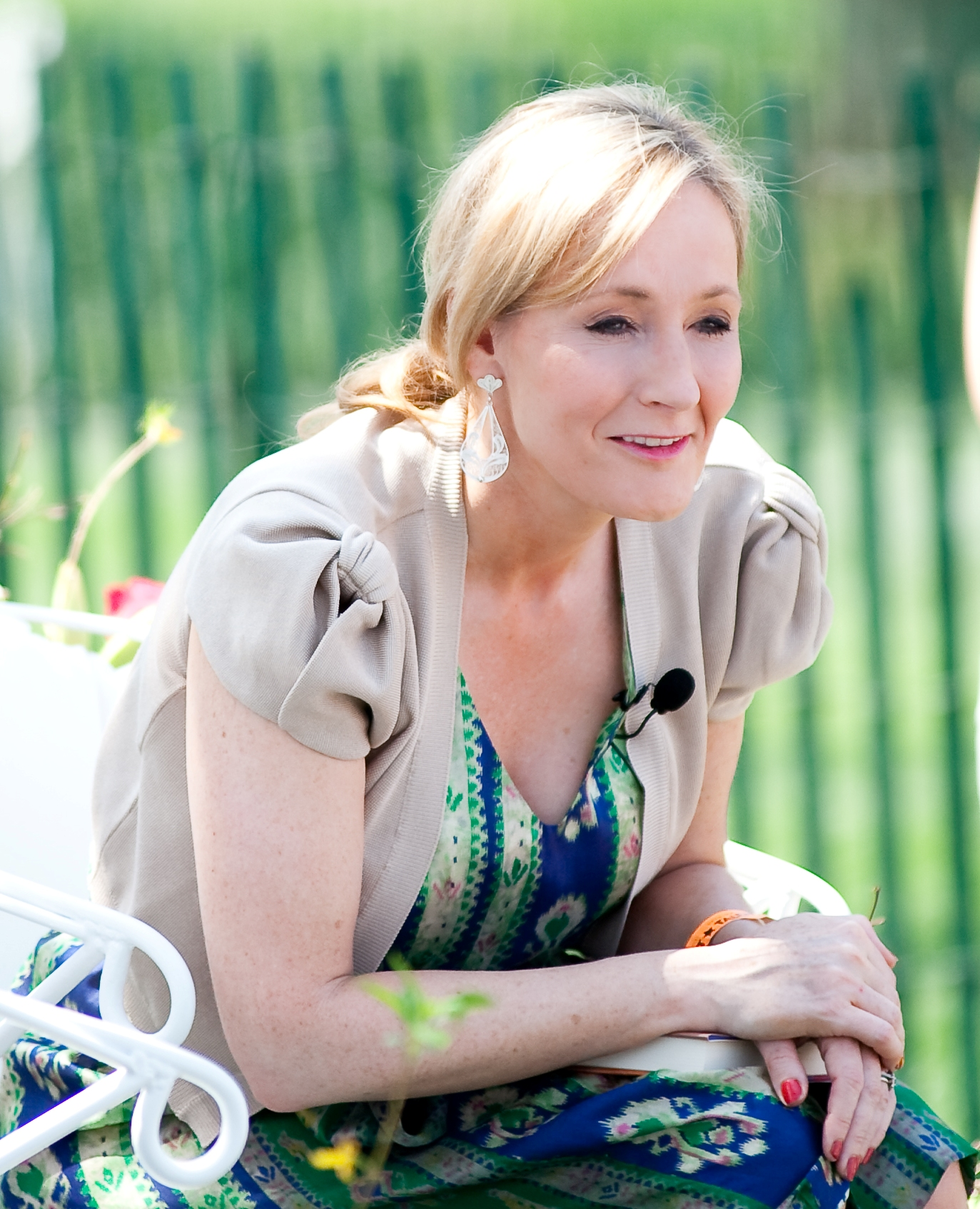
J K Rowling, author

- Dolly Alderton - author
- Nina Allan - author of speculative fiction and winner of the Grand Prix de l'Imaginaire for Best Foreign Novel in 2014
- Steve Bell - cartoonist (PGCE 1975, St Luke's)
- Alice Birch - playwright and screenwriter
- Robert Bolt - Oscar and BAFTA-winning playwright and screenwriter
- Nick Burbridge - author of poetry, plays, novels and songs; founder of folk-rock band McDermott's Two Hours
- Stanley Donwood (aka Dan Rickwood) - artist and writer
- Jon Edgar - sculptor
- David Eldridge - playwright
- Milly Johnson - author
- Santa Montefiore - author
- Abi Morgan - screenwriter
- Ian Mortimer - historian and historical biographer
- Roger Nash - philosopher and poet
- Suniti Namjoshi - writer
- John O'Farrell - author
- Primrose Pitman - artist
- Mark Power - photographer
- J. K. Rowling - author of the Harry Potter books - BA French and Classics
- Robert Shearman - playwright, short story writer and screenwriter (including Doctor Who episode Dalek (2005))
- Carol Shields - author and Pulitzer Prize winner
- Zoë Skoulding - poet
- Robert Sloman - playwright and writer for Doctor Who in the 1970s
- Lady Teresa Waugh - novelist
- William John Seward Webber sculptor, attended Exeter School of Art

=== Others ===
- Belabbes Benkredda - Algerian-German social innovator, founder of The Munathara Initiative, and 2013 NDI Democracy Award recipient
- Laurie Brokenshire - Commodore and puzzle specialist
- Laury Haytayan - MENA officer in the Natural Resource Charter framework, and civil activist in Lebanon
- Dame Suzi Leather - Chairwoman of the Charity Commission
- Catherine Nettleton - Senior British diplomat
- Tuppy Owens - sexuality campaigner
