= Losada =

Losada may refer to:

People:

- Alberto Losada (born 1982), Spanish road bicycle racer
- Antón Losada Diéguez (1884–1929), Spanish writer and politician
- Amalia Puga de Losada (1866-1963), Peruvian writer, poet, novelist and essayist
- Carolina Losada (born 1972), Argentine politician, television presenter and journalist
- Carolina Soto Losada, Colombian politician
- Diego de Losada (1511–1569), Spanish conquistador, founder of Caracas, Venezuela
- Diego de Quiroga y Losada, acting Governor of Spanish Florida
- Diego Losada (born 1972), Uruguayan basketball player
- Eloy Tato Losada, (1923–2022), Spanish-born Catholic prelate
- Endika Bordas Losada (born 1982), Spanish footballer
- Euriamis Losada (born 1983), Cuban American actor
- Francisco Losada (1612-1667), Spanish composer
- Hernán Losada (born 1982), Argentine football player
- Isabel Losada, British writer and actress, singer, dancer, and TV producer
- Jessi Losada, American sportscaster
- Joan Losada (born 1992), Spanish rugby player
- José Manuel Losada (born 1962), literary theorist
- Juan Armada y Losada (1861–1932), Spanish politician
- Julio Losada (born 1950), Uruguayan footballer
- Leonel Figueredo Losada (born 1988), Mexican chess master
- Manuel Hermida Losada (1924–2005), Spanish footballer
- Marcial Losada (born 1939), Chilean psychologist
- Mario Losada, Argentine politician,
- Nahuel Losada (born 1993), Argentine football player
- Roberto Losada (born 1976), Spanish footballer
- Sebastián Losada (born 1967), Spanish footballer
- Vicky Losada (born 1991), Spanish football player

Geography:

- Losada River, river in Colombia

Other:

- Losada, a genus of wasps
- Losada Line, Critical positivity ratio or Losada ratio, largely discredited concept in positive psychology
- Editorial Losada, traditional Argentine publishing house founded in 1938

== See also ==
- LSDA (disambiguation)
- Los Adaes
- Lousada
- Lousadzak
