= LSDA Northern Ireland =

Part of the Learning and Skills Network

LSDA Northern Ireland (LSDA NI) was part of the Learning and Skills Network (LSN), with a role to support all forms of post-16 education and training in Northern Ireland.

LSDA Northern Ireland operated from an office in Alfred House, Alfred Street, Belfast. It supported Further Education Colleges, Training providers and Community Providers who offered government funded training and vocational education courses in Northern Ireland.

== History ==
Established in 2003 as part of the Learning and Skills Development Agency (LSDA), LSDA Northern Ireland's core funding came from the Department for Employment and Learning Northern Ireland (DEL). When LSDA was split into the Quality Improvement Agency (QIA) and Learning and Skills Network (LSN) in 2006, LSDA Northern Ireland retained its title and function, as part of LSN.

== Periodical publications ==
LSDA NI published and distributed two quarterly periodicals in paper and electronic format, with an average paper circulation of 1000 copies:

- LSDA NI Briefing - a quarterly, glossy, full-colour with features relating to the whole spectrum of LSDA NI's work
- Essential - a quarterly, glossy, full-colour with features relating to Essential Skills. The final issue, the twenty third, was published in June 2010.

LSDA NI also published an occasional publication: ESOLutions - a glossy, full-colour with features relating to English for Speakers of Other Languages (ESOL).

== Cross-border collaboration ==
In September 2008, LSDA NI signed a memorandum of understanding to collaborate with NALA, Ireland's National Adult Literacy Agency. The objective was to enhance opportunities for people with literacy needs across the island of Ireland. The memorandum outlined an agreement between the two agencies to cooperate, share experience and organise joint conferences.

This collaboration culminated in a cross-border Essential Skills Conference, held at Ballymascanlon House, Dundalk on Wednesday 26 November 2008. The Stormont Minister for Employment and Learning, Reg Empey attended with his Republic of Ireland counterpart, Minister for Lifelong Learning, Seán Haughey. One hundred delegates heard from literacy champions such as Dr Rosie Wickert of Southern Cross University, Australia and Dr Ursula Howard of the University of London, previously director of the National Research and Development Centre for adult literacy and numeracy. An example of best practice for integrating literacy into the workplace was given by Patrick McCartan, CBE, Chairman of Belfast Health and Social Services Board. Kathleen Cramer, Manager of the Youth Training and Development Centre in Newbridge, gave an account of how her centre applied the integrated approach. Blathnaid Ni Chinneide from the National Adult Literacy Agency described NALA’s experience in this area and outlined guidelines for integrating literacy into training and further education.

== Rapid decline and collapse ==
In March 2010, Learning and Skills Network, LSDA NI's parent organisation, reported reserves of £11.2 million. As part of LSN's development plan, they made an investment of £8.8 million in acquisitions that same year. At the same time they also announced a first round of redundancies. This investment and restructuring failed to result in an improvement in the organisation's fortunes, with income dropping by around 50% during the following year. In a last-ditch attempt to further restructure the organisation, a second round of redundancies was announced in the Spring of 2011. LSN shed more than one hundred members of staff during these two redundancy processes. Once again, these efforts were unsuccessful and LSN finally went into administration in November 2012. A buyer for the whole organisation was not found and LSN and LSDA NI closed their doors for the last time several days before Christmas 2011.

== See also ==
- Learning and Skills Development Agency
- Learning and Skills Network
- Quality Improvement Agency
- Learning and Skills Improvement Service
