= Averroes International School Lalmatia =

Private English-medium school in Dhaka, Bangladesh

- এভেরোজ ইন্টারন্যাশনাল স্কুল লালমাটিয়া

Location
- House 7/16, Block B, Lalmatia, Mohammadpur; Dhaka, 1207; Bangladesh

Information
- Other name: Averroes International School; AISL
- Type: Private English-medium school
- Motto: One School Serving the Purposes of Here and Hereafter
- Established: 15 October 2015
- Founder: Khan Md. Aktaruzzaman
- School board: Board of Intermediate and Secondary Education, Dhaka
- School code: EIIN 190129
- Chairman: Khan Md. Aktaruzzaman
- Teaching staff: ~275
- Grades: Playgroup to A Level
- Gender: Co-educational
- Enrolment: ~2,300 (2026)
- Education system: British curriculum (Pearson Edexcel; Cambridge)
- Language: English
- Campuses: 6
- Campus type: Urban
- Accreditation: Pearson centre 90561
- Website: aisl.edu.bd

Averroes International School Lalmatia (Bengali: এভেরোজ ইন্টারন্যাশনাল স্কুল লালমাটিয়া), also known as Averroes International School and commonly abbreviated AISL, is a private English-medium school in Lalmatia, Mohammadpur, Dhaka, Bangladesh. It was founded in 2015 by Khan Md. Aktaruzzaman and teaches from playgroup to A Level, including a Quran memorisation programme alongside the British curriculum.

The school is registered with the Board of Intermediate and Secondary Education, Dhaka under Education Institute Identification Number (EIIN) 190129 and appears in Pearson records as examination centre 90561. It later operated further campuses in Dhaka; the Lalmatia school and the Mirpur campus are now separately managed.

== History ==
Averroes International School opened on 15 October 2015 in Lalmatia as a proprietorship of Khan Md. Aktaruzzaman. Aktaruzzaman has stated that some pupils joined after Peace International School closed that year, and that Averroes then ran campuses in Lalmatia, Mirpur and Uttara.

In December 2019 the school received the Best Chain School of the Year 2019 award at the International School Awards in Dubai. The school states that it had also received a Best Pre-School award in the same series in 2018.

By 2020 the school had three branches, six campuses and more than 1,400 students. By 2024 enrolment across the three branches was almost 4,000.

== Campus ==
Campus building, Lalmatia

Boys' campus building

Girls' campus building

The main campus is at House 7/16, Block B, Lalmatia, Mohammadpur. The school states that it operates six campuses, with science and computer laboratories, a library and sports areas among its facilities. Annual sports competitions have been held at the Government Physical Education College ground in Mohammadpur. The school also lists a campus in Banasree, Rampura.

== Academics ==
The curriculum is English-medium through A Level and includes Quran memorisation and Islamic studies. Courses follow British pathways linked to Pearson Edexcel and Cambridge; Pearson lists the school as centre 90561. Pupils have taken O Level and A Level examinations since 2019.

On 31 October 2026 a Hifz and O/A Level convocation was held at the Senaprangan Convention Hall. Fifty-four students who had completed Quran memorisation and 85 who had completed O Level or A Level studies were recognised.

== Extracurricular activities ==
Annual sports competitions have been held since 2019. On 26 January 2026 the Lalmatia campus held its sports competition at the Government Physical Education College ground in Mohammadpur, with about 2,300 students and 242 events.

== See also ==
- Averroes International School Mirpur
- List of schools in Bangladesh
- Education in Bangladesh
- English-medium education
