= LSDA =

LSDA may refer to

- Learning and Skills Development Agency, UK
- Le Seigneur des anneaux, French translation of The Lord of the Rings
- Local Spin-Density Approximation
- London School of Dramatic Art
- LSDA Northern Ireland
