= North East Autism Society =

English public service organisation

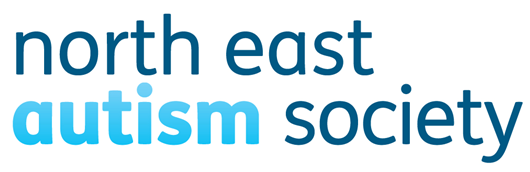
North East Autism Society Logo as of 2009

North East Autism Society (NEAS), previously Tyne and Wear Autistic Society (1980–2009), is an English public service organisation established by parents in 1980 to provide educational and residential programmes to children with an Autism spectrum Condition. The Society bought Thornhill Tower as its base on Thornhill Park, Sunderland creating a residential school. After which, The White House was purchased at South Shields that was subsequently sold to buy Thornholme House, a former hospital, establishing a comprehensive base within the Sunderland region. Thornhill Park became the location for the Society's main bases when in 1994, the Adult Services was established with the opening of a small specialist college at number 14 Thornhill Park. Community Services was then formed in 2009. As of the present day the Society has developed rapidly and is now one of the primary providers of specialist care and support for individuals with an ASC in the North East of England. The Society has recently opened the North East Centre for Autism in County Durham which has increased the operational area and range of the services it provides.

There are four main services within the organisation, including:

Service	Ages	Location
Child Services	4-19	Sunderland and Durham
Adult Services	16+	Sunderland, Durham, Tyneside and the Tees Valley
Therapy Services	All Ages	Sunderland and Durham
Central Services (Management and Development Operations)	N/A	Durham

NEAS operate a school, Thornhill Park School, a college, Thornbeck College, a day centre, New Warlands Farm and community support services. Traditionally, Sunderland has been the base for all NEAS services but since the change of company name and direction in 2009, several relocations have taken place to broaden the catchment area of the service. The head office, supported living homes, Adult Services day centres, Thornbeck College and the new Centre for Autism are all based in County Durham. Community Services (part of both Adult and Children's Services) reaches as far north as Tyneside and also has bases in Sunderland and Durham.

== Thornhill Park School and The North East Centre for Autism ==
Thornhill Park School was founded in 1980 by a group of parents whose children had Autism Spectrum Condition. They wanted to send their children to a school where the staff understood their needs and where each child would be helped to achieve his or her full potential. Since the 1980s the school has become firmly established as a major regional and national resource. Today they can offer places for up to 91 children and young people. All children may also benefit from 24-hour programmes of care, following an assessment for the individual child and their family.

== Thornbeck College ==
Thornbeck College is an Independent Specialist College (ISC) for individuals with autism, learning difficulties and or disabilities. Thornbeck College is based on the outskirts of Durham City Centre on the grounds of East Durham College, Houghall Campus. The college forms part of the North East Autism Society (NEAS) and was awarded Grade 1 'Outstanding' status in September 2009 by Ofsted and Learning and Skills Improvement Service (LSIS) Beacon Status in 2010.

Thornbeck College provides specialist services for individuals based on the individual learners assessed needs and provides opportunities for learners to progress academically, socially, morally and be an active member of the local community.

The college's programme focuses around 'Skills for Independence and Work' and ensuring the programme meets the individual needs, interests and aspirations of learners.

Thornbeck College provides many vocational areas including Business Administration, Horticulture, Catering & Hospitality, Retail and Floristry plus a wide range of personal and social development opportunities such as independent travel training, meal preparation and health & well-being activities. Thornbeck College also works with local employers to provide work experience opportunities for learners.

=== Derwent Street Retail Environment ===
The retail department is based at the NEAS shop in Sunderland City Centre where students learn how to greet and serve customers, handle money, record sales, check stock and create window displays. However the lease on the shop is due to expire within the next year to coincide with the Society's relocation to Durham. The business administration department enables students to learn how to use ICT skills to produce catalogues and price lists, use office equipment and file documents. They also use the telephone to arrange community sales. Customers are encouraged to contact students directly, rather than through the North East Autism Society.

=== Partnerships ===
Thornbeck College works with a range of schools, colleges, employers, organisations and agencies to increase and improve the capacity and capabilities both regionally and nationally.

== Day services ==
=== New Warlands Farm, Sunderland Workshop and Darlington Workshop. ===
North East Autism Society (Day Services) offers a Social and Vocational Programme for adults with a diagnosis of ASC or Asperger's. Most of the Service Users who attend the programme have other associated learning difficulties although not exclusively.

The purpose of the Social and Vocational Programme is to offer lifelong learning in the areas of vocational, occupational and social context. These include functioning life skills in which service users are supported and empowered to build upon. Day Services offer a structured environment whereby the Service User can partake in a range of programme areas.
