= AISD =

AISD may refer to:

- Arlington Independent School District, Texas, US
  - List of school districts in Texas (several other Independent School Districts begin with A)
- American International School Dhaka, Bangladesh
- Averroes International School, Dhaka, Bangladesh
