= Aftab Nagar =

- Residential area
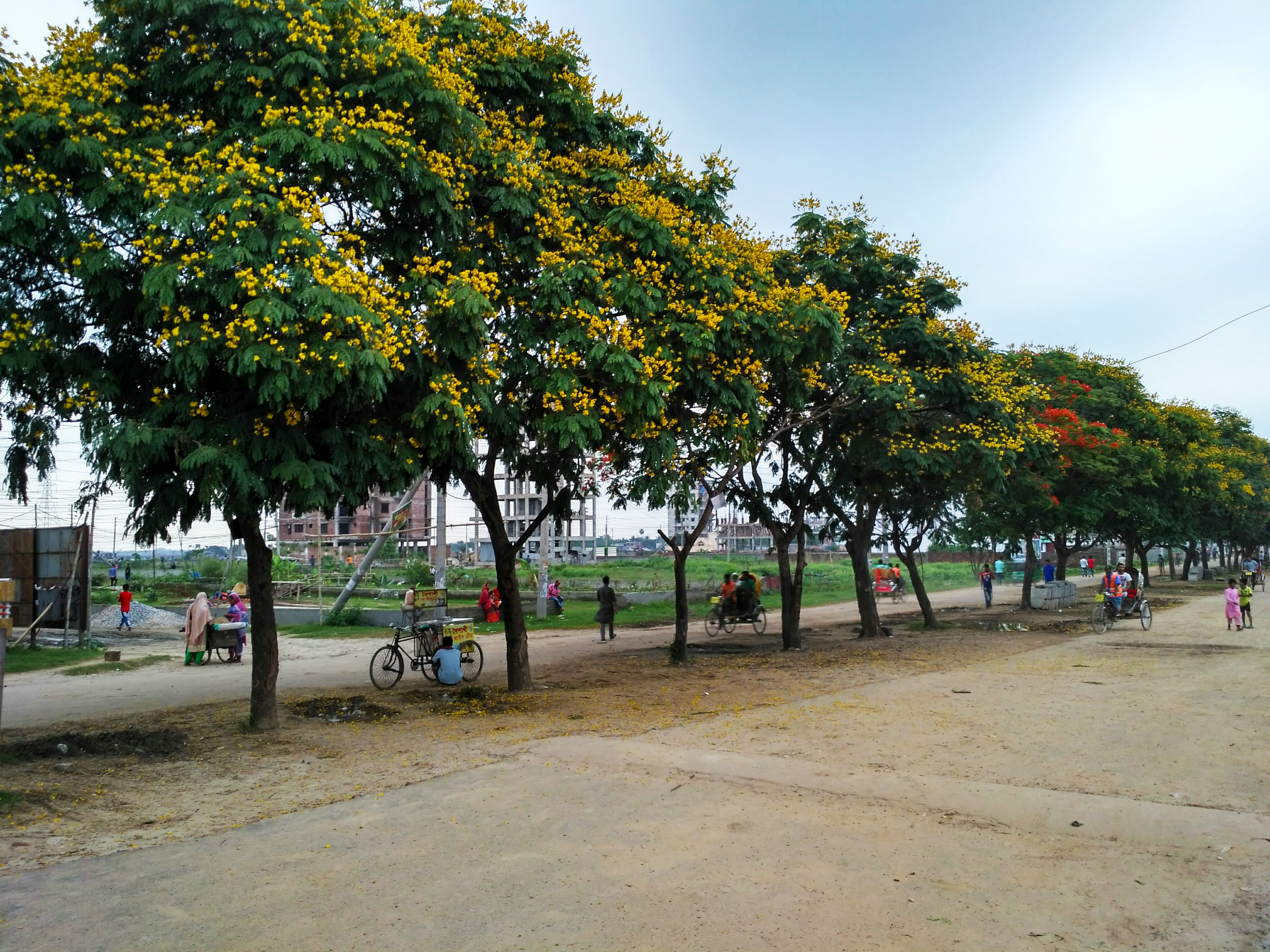
- Aftabnagar area of Dhaka

- Location of Aftabnagar within Dhaka
- Coordinates: 23.7684°N 90.4237°E
- Country: Bangladesh
- Division: Dhaka
- District: Dhaka
- Time zone: UTC+06:00 (BST)

Aftab Nagar (originally known as Jahurul Islam City) is a neighbourhood in Dhaka that is initiated by Eastern Housing Limited. Aftabnagar sits in the heart of Dhaka. The area still holds the lush green environment of Dhaka. In the autumn season, there are fields of Catkin flowers or 'Kaashbon'.

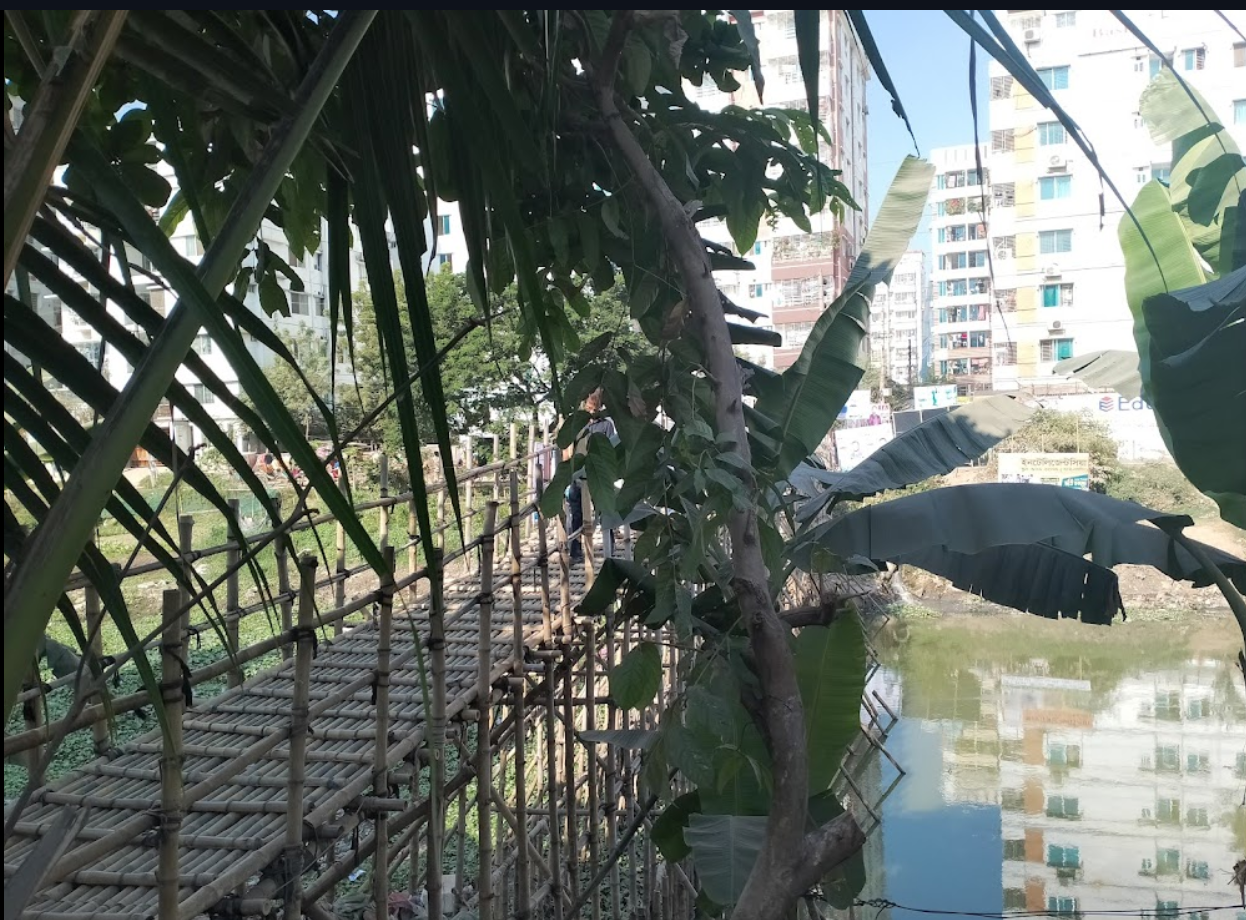
An example of what the bamboo bridge or "basher shako" looks like

Right next door to Aftabnagar, is the Meradia Haat; which is one of the known marts of Dhaka for vegetables, meat and groceries. Aftabnagar also has a Khal (i.e the Norai River) that connects the waterbody of Hatirjheel to the Balu river, this canal allows the traders of meradia haat easily transport their goods and this 'khal' is what borders Aftabnagar to Banasree and connects with each other by bamboo bridges known as 'Basher Shako'. Aftabnagar also has a cattle mart that sets in the season of Qurbani.

Aftabnagar has a few well-known universities nearby such as East West University and BRAC University, going slightly further there is the Canadian University of Bangladesh. It also has the regional passport office of Dhaka east too.

== Location ==
Aftabnagar is situated inside Badda Thana with Banasree to the south, Hatirjheel and Gulshan to the west, and Merul Badda to the north.

The postal code of Aftabnagar is Dhaka-1212. Additionally, the area of Aftabnagar is a part of Ward-37 and falls under the electoral constituency of Dhaka-11 and is a part of the Dhaka North City Corporation.

== Demographics ==
As per the EHL website regarding Aftab Nagar, there is said to be around 300,000 residents living in Aftab Nagar and around 5 kilometers of housing-enlisted space.

== Segments ==
Aftabnagar is divided into 14 blocks, A-N, which further subdivide into different sectors of their own.

== See also ==
- Banasree
- Rampura
- Gulshan
- Niketan
- West Rajabazar
- Shantinagar, Dhaka
- Mirpur DOHS
