= TKN =

TKN, Tkn or tkn may refer to:

- TKN F.C. (Thang Kiang Nam), a Malaysian football club
- TKN (song), a 2020 song by Rosalía and Travis Scott
- Takanelite, mineral symbol Tkn
- Tankuppa, station code TKN, a railway station in India
- Taokaenoi Food & Marketing (stock ticker symbol TKN), manufacturers of Tao Kae Noi, a crispy seaweed snack product
- Tokunoshima Airport, Japan, IATA airport code TKN
- Tokunoshima language, in Japan, ISO:639-3 language code tkn
- Total Kjeldahl nitrogen, the sum of nitrogen in the chemical analysis of soil, water, or waste water
- Trade Knowledge Network, a collaboration of research institutions
- National Transportation Knowledge Network, a service of the United States National Transportation Library
