= Learning and Skills Network =

LSN (Learning and Skills Network) was an independent not-for-profit organisation in the United Kingdom that provided consulting, outsourcing, research, technology and training services for learning and skills.

It went into administration in November 2011.

== History ==
In 1995 two organisations merged, the Further Education Unit – an agency on curriculum issues – and the Staff College, which trained staff in the further education sector. This new organisation was known as the Further Education Development Agency (FEDA).

FEDA was then renamed the Learning and Skills Development Agency (LSDA) in November 2000 to reflect its widening remit across the learning and skills sector. LSDA’s programmes in research, training and consultancy continued as normal under the banner of the Learning and Skills Network. In 2006 LSDA’s policy and strategic work developed into the Quality Improvement Agency for Lifelong Learning (QIA), now known as the Learning and Skills Improvement Service (LSIS). LSDA's work went on to become an independent organisation - the Learning and Skills Network.

On 28 March 2006 Learning and Skills Network registered as a UK charity (Registered No. 1113456) with the following stated objectives:

1. To promote the improvement, development and opportunities for development of the performance and skills of members of the teaching, management and other staff of the education, learning skills and children's services sectors in such a way that they are better able to be more effective and efficient in the development of the education, learning and skills of their pupils, students and other learners; and

2. To promote, encourage and develop education, learning and skills in the united kingdom and elsewhere, and in particular, by advising upon, developing and providing education, learning and skills courses, by providing flexible and innovative solutions to the education, learning and skills sector's demands and by facilitating the capability of people and organisations to provide support for learner development.

After further business developments, acquiring a selection of UK training-specialist companies including e-learning solutions provider Learning Resources International in the process, and a re-brand in 2009, the organisation officially became LSN and operated across a multitude of sectors including further education, higher education, local authorities, schools, public services and the private sector, in the UK and internationally.

In 2010, LSN entered into a joint venture with Oxford & Cherwell Valley College to take over ownership of Reading College, a further education college in Reading, Berkshire, UK, from then owners Thames Valley University (renamed University of West London in 2011).

LSN went into administration in November 2011. Post administration some of the purchased companies were re-acquired by their previous owners, including Learning Resources International, which has re-branded and repositioned itself as an all-in-one e-learning solutions provider for training providers and learning and development professionals.
