= Stayt =

Stayt is a surname. Notable people with the surname include:

- Charlie Stayt (born 1962), British journalist
- Tom Stayt (born 1986), British cricketer
