= QIA =

Qia or QIA may refer to:

== Qia ==
- He Qia (died after 228), a high-ranking Chinese official during the Three Kingdoms period
- Xi Qia (1883–1950), a general of the Kirin Provincial Army of the Republic of China

== QIA ==
- Quality Improvement Agency, in the United Kingdom
- Qatar Investment Authority, sovereign wealth fund
- A stock ticker symbol for Qiagen, a biotechnology company
