= Geoffrey Holland =

Sir Geoffrey Holland KCB
- Born: 9 May 1938; North Surrey, England
- Died: 20 April 2017 (aged 78); St. Ives, Cornwall
- Education: Merchant Taylors' School, Northwood
- Alma mater: St John's College, University of Oxford (BA)
- Occupations: Civil servant, university administrator
- Employer(s): Ministry of Labour; Department for Education; Learning and Skills Development Agency; Quality Improvement Agency
- Organisation: National Committee of Inquiry into Higher Education
- Spouse: Lady Carol Holland MBE (née Challen)
- Parent: Frank Holland

Vice-chancellor of University of Exeter
- In office 1994–2002
- Preceded by: Sir David Harrison
- Succeeded by: Sir Steve Smith

President of the Marine Biological Association of the United Kingdom
- In office 2008–2014
- Preceded by: Howard Dalton
- Succeeded by: John Beddington

Sir Geoffrey Holland, KCB (9 May 1938 – 20 April 2017) was an English career civil servant who became Vice-Chancellor of the University of Exeter from 1994 to 2002, when he was succeeded by Professor Steve Smith. Holland Hall, a large student hall of residence which opened in 2004 on the Exeter campus is named after him.

== Early life ==
Holland was born on 9 May 1938 to Frank Holland CBE and his wife, Elsie Freda Holland. His father was a civil servant for London County Council. Both of his parents came from the Potteries in north Staffordshire.

He was educated at Merchant Taylors' School, Northwood on a scholarship and spent two years in the Royal Tank Regiment for National Service, becoming a Second Lieutenant. He received a first class BA honours degree in Modern Languages from St John's College, Oxford.

== Career ==
He joined the Ministry of Labour in 1961, working as a civil servant until the 1990s in the Department of Employment, becoming the Permanent Secretary at the Department for Education (DFE) from 1993-4. He was knighted in 1989. In 1994 he became Vice-chancellor of the University of Exeter. He was a member of the National Committee of Inquiry into Higher Education that published an influential report in 1997.

In August 2003, he was appointed Chair of the Learning and Skills Development Agency. In 2006, he was appointed Chair of the Quality Improvement Agency.

From 1998-2000 he was President of the IPD. In 2008 he became President of the Marine Biological Association of the United Kingdom.

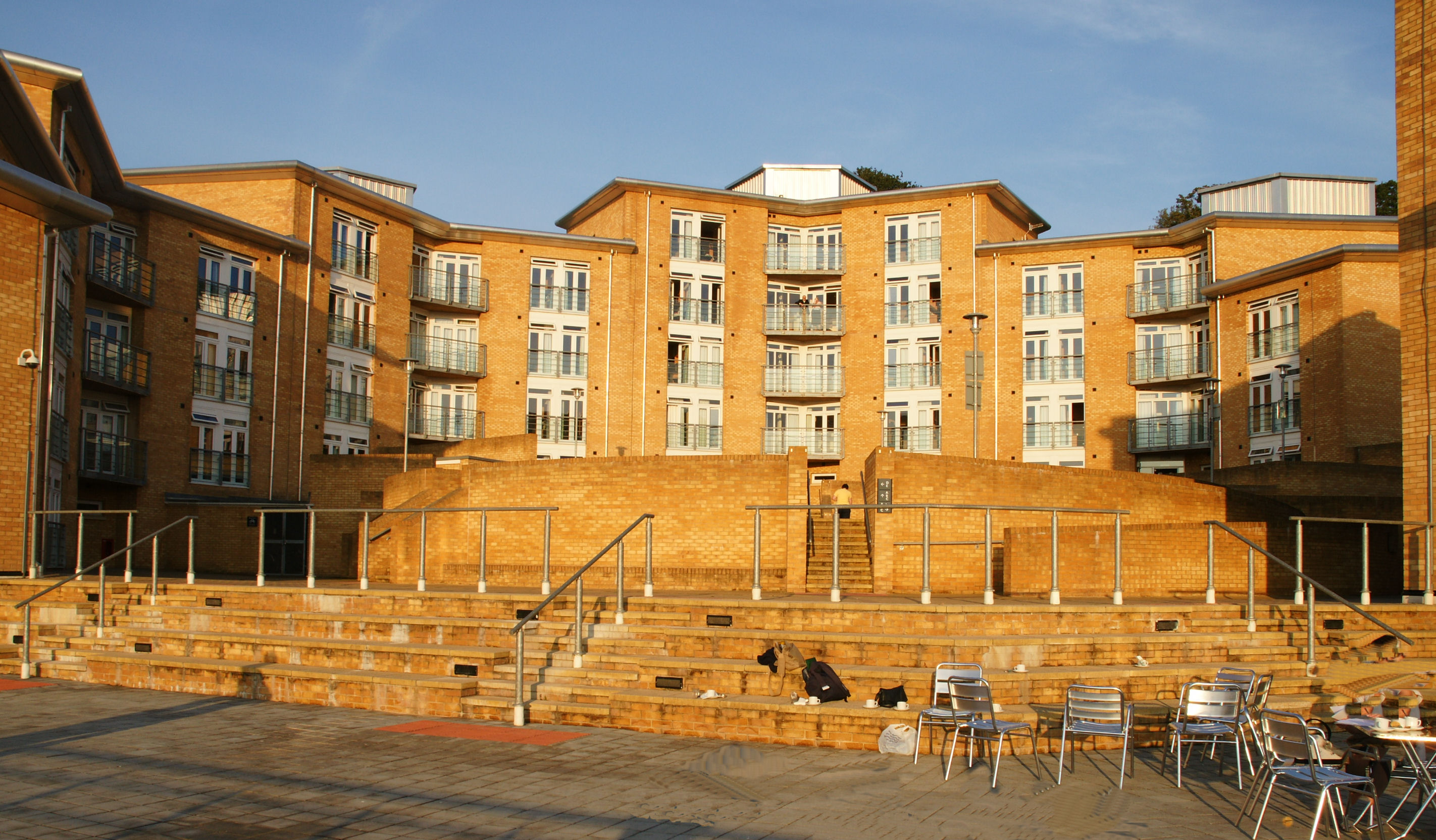
Holland Hall, a hall of residence for students at University of Exeter, is named after Sir Geoffrey Holland.

== Personal life ==
In 1964 he married Carol Challen.

He died on 20 April 2017 at the age of 78.

Government offices
Preceded by none	Second Permanent Secretary of the Department of Employment; 1986–1988	Succeeded by none
Preceded by Sir Michael Quinlan	Permanent Secretary of the Department of Employment; 1988–1993	Succeeded by Sir Nicholas Monck
Preceded by Sir John Caines	Permanent Secretary of the Department for Education; 1993–1994	Succeeded by Sir Tim Lankester
Academic offices
Preceded by Sir David Harrison	Vice-Chancellor of the University of Exeter; 1994–2002	Succeeded by Professor Steve Smith
