= Nicholas Monck (civil servant) =

English civil servant

Sir Nicholas Jeremy Monck, KCB (9 March 1935 – 14 August 2013) was an English civil servant.

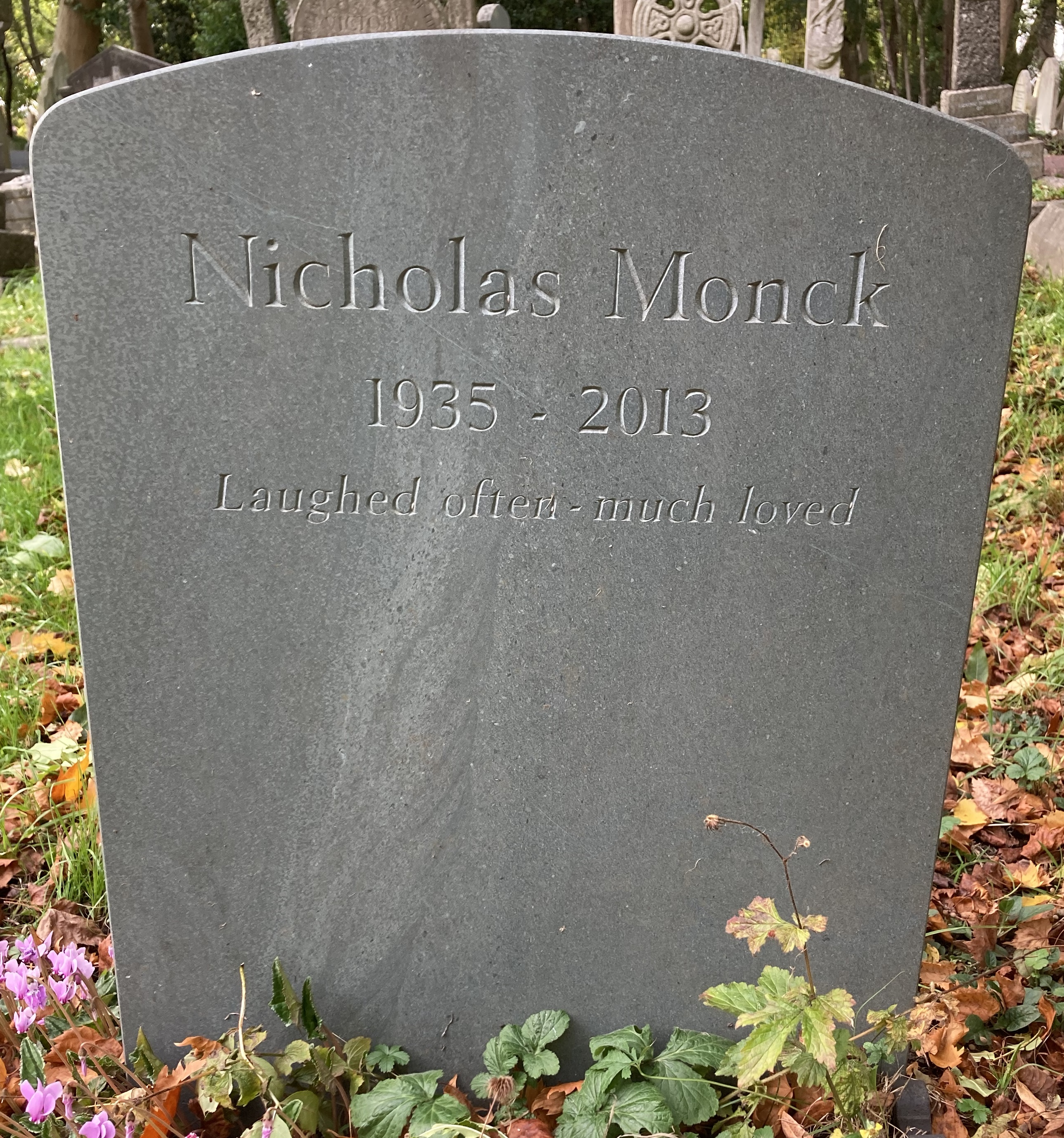
Grave of Nicholas Monck in Highgate Cemetery

== Biography ==
Monck was educated at Eton College and King's College, Cambridge. After National Service in the Royal Horse Artillery, he studied at the University of Pennsylvania and the London School of Economics. He entered the Ministry of Power in 1959. From 1966 to 1969, he was a senior economist to the Tanzanian government. Returning to the civil service in 1969, he worked in HM Treasury and was principal private secretary to the Chancellor of the Exchequer from 1976 to 1977. He was deputy secretary with responsibility for industry from 1984 to 1990, then Second Permanent Secretary with responsibility for public expenditure from 1990 to 1992. From 1993 to his retirement in 1995, he was Permanent Secretary of the Department for Employment.

He is buried on the eastern side of Highgate Cemetery.

Government offices
Preceded by Sir Geoffrey Holland	Permanent Secretary of the Department of Employment; 1993–1995	Succeeded by Sir Michael Bichard
