= Ruth Silver =

Dame Ruth Muldoon Silver (born January 1945, North Lanarkshire) is a British academic administrator and promoter of education policy. She was Principal of Lewisham College for 17 years until 2009, and was chair of the Working Men's College governing board from 2002-05. In 2010, she became the chair of the Learning and Skills Improvement Service (LSIS), a public body for Further Education and skills development. Most recently she was president of the Further Education Trust for Leadership (FETL).

== Early life ==
Siver was born in January 1945; her mother a midwife, her father an engineer. She studied psychology and literature at Glasgow and the Southampton universities, through a National Union of Mineworkers' scholarship.

== Career ==
Silver served as an adviser to the Select Committee in the House of Commons and a member of the Skills Commission. She sat on the Edge Foundation (ADHD), which aims to raise the status of vocational learning; the Horse's Mouth, an online peer-mentoring enterprise; and the Trinity Laban Conservatoire.

Silver was appointed Chief Assessor for the Centre of Excellence in Leadership's Principals Qualifying Programme. Her employment has included child guidance, teaching and inspection, and in-service at the Department for Education and Skills, developing national education policy on personal development in young people. In 2010, she was appointed to chair the National Taskforce on the Future of the Careers Profession.

Silver was a founding trustee of the Edge Foundation, which aims to raising the status of vocational learning, and was the first chief assessor for the Qualifying Programme for Principals. She was a visiting professor on educational developments at London South Bank University.

She was a member of Prime Minister Gordon Brown's UK Women and Work Commission. In 2014, she worked with Glasgow's colleges in the post-merger realignment of their curricula. In 2015-16, she chaired the Scottish Government's Commission on Widening Access to Universities.

== Honours ==
In 2006, she was made a Dame Commander of the Order of the British Empire in recognition for her services to Further Education, having previously been appointed CBE in the 1998 New Year Honours.
