= Shams Rahman =

Bangladeshi academic and researcher

- শামস রহমান

6th Vice-chancellor of the East West University
- In office 18 Oct 2023 – Present

Personal details
- Born: Mohammad Shams-ur Rahman
- Education: Mirzapur Cadet College; Belarusian State Technological University; Asian Institute of Technology; University of Exeter
- Occupation: Academic; Researcher

Mohammad Shamsur Rahman, commonly known as Shams Rahman, is a Bangladeshi academic and researcher. He currently serves as the Vice-Chancellor of East West University. Rahman is internationally recognized for his contributions to the field of supply chain management.

== Education ==
Rahman completed his schooling at Mirzapur Cadet College. He earned a bachelor's degree in Mechanical Engineering from the Belarusian State Technological University followed by a master's degree in Industrial Engineering and Management from the Asian Institute of Technology. He later obtained his PhD in Management from the University of Exeter in the UK, under a Commonwealth Scholarship.

== Career ==
Rahman served as a Professor of Supply Chain Management at RMIT University in Melbourne, Australia. In October 2023, he was appointed as the sixth Vice-Chancellor of East West University in Dhaka, Bangladesh.

Also, he is an Associate Editor of the International Journal of Information Systems and Supply Chain Management and serves on the editorial boards of more than 15 international academic journals.

== Views ==
In 2022, Rahman gave an interview to Somoy TV in which he claimed that former President Ziaur Rahman could not speak, read, or write Bangla, asserting instead that he spoke Urdu. He characterized the national vote of confidence held for President Ziaur Rahman on May 30, 1977, as an act of dictatorship that deceived the people.

== Personal life ==
Rahman is married and has children.

== See also ==
- List of University of Exeter people
