= Lisa Roberts (academic) =

Vice chancellor and chief executive of the University of Exeter

Vice Chancellor of the University of Exeter
- Incumbent
- Assumed office September 2020
- Preceded by: Sir Steve Smith

Personal details
- Education: University of Birmingham (BSc); University of Kent (MSc, PhD)

Academic work
- Discipline: Microbiology; Virology

Lisa O. Roberts is vice chancellor and President of the University of Exeter. She took over from Professor Steve Smith on his retirement on 1 September 2020. She received a vote of no confidence from the university's branch of the University and College Union in 2026 over proposed staff redundancies.

== Early life ==
In 1990, Roberts graduated with a Bachelor of Science in medical microbiology and general microbiology from the University of Birmingham.

== Career ==
After graduation, Roberts joined Procter and Gamble as a product development manager in the UK and Belgium. In 1995, she moved to the BBSRC Institute for Animal Health (now the Pirbright Institute) and the University of Kent, where she studied for a PhD in molecular virology. In 1998, she joined the University of Surrey academic staff, where she became lecturer, senior lecturer, and Professor of Virology. By 2012, she was executive dean of the Faculty of Health and Medical Sciences at the University of Surrey, where she launched a new school of veterinary medicine In 2016, she moved to the University of Leeds. In 2019, it was announced that she would succeed Sir Steve Smith on his retirement as vice-chancellor and chief executive at the University of Exeter as of 1 September 2020.

In 2022, Roberts was made Chair of the Department for Education Spiking Working Group to lead a group of academics, practitioners and student victims to improve the prevention of and responses to spiking.

In 2023, students criticised the university for extending its research partnership with the oil company Shell for a further five years, following a media investigation into the company's use of carbon credits. Roberts defended the 15-year partnership, saying it was intended to help Shell decarbonise and that the university's climate scientists supported working with the company on its transition.

In June 2026, Roberts announced proposals placing around 500 staff at risk of redundancy. The Exeter branch of the University and College Union passed a vote of no confidence in Roberts, and said it would begin preparing for a strike ballot if management did not change course. The university said the proposals amounted to a reduction of around 150 full-time roles, which it hoped to achieve through voluntary redundancies, and that no departments or disciplines would be closed.

== Publications ==
- Roberts, LO; and Belsham, GJ (1997): Complementation of defective picornavirus ribosome entry site (IRES) elements by the coexpression of fragments of the IRES. Virology, Vol.227 (1), pp53-62. DOI: https://doi.org/10.1006/viro.1996.8312
- Roberts, LO; Seamons, RA; and Belsham, GJ (1998): Recognition of picornavirus internal ribosome entry sites within cells; influence of cellular and viral proteins. RNA, Vol.4 (5), pp 520-529. DOI: https://doi.org/10.1017/S1355838298971989
- Woolaway, KE; Lazaridis, K; Belsham, GJ; Carter, MJ; and Roberts, LO (2001): The 5 untranslated region of Rhopalosiphum padi virus contains an internal ribosome entry site which functions efficiently in mammalian, plant, and insect translation systems. Virology, Vol.75 (21), pp 10244-10249. DOI: https://doi.org/10.1128/JVI.75.21.10244-10249.2001
- Al-Molawi, N; Beardmore, VA; Carter, MJ; Kass, GEN; and Roberts, LO (2003): Caspase-mediated cleavage of the feline calicivirus capsid protein. Journal of General Virology, Vol.84, pp1237-1244. DOI: https://doi.org/10.1099/vir.0.18840-0
- Karakasiliotis, I; Chaudhry, Y; Roberts, LO; and Goodfellow, IG (2006): Feline calicivirus replication requirement for polypyrimidine tract-binding protein is temperature-dependent. Journal of General Virology, Vol.87, pp.3339-3347. DOI: https://doi.org/10.1099/vir.0.82153-0

Academic offices
| Preceded by unknown | Deputy Vice-Chancellor: Research and Innovation of the University of Leeds; 2016-2020 | Succeeded by unknown |
| Preceded by Steve Smith | Vice-Chancellor of the University of Exeter; 2020- | Succeeded by current |
