= Steve Smith (political scientist) =

International Relations theorist, Vice-Chancellor of the University of Exeter (born 1952)

Professor Sir Steve Smith FAcSS FRSA FLSW
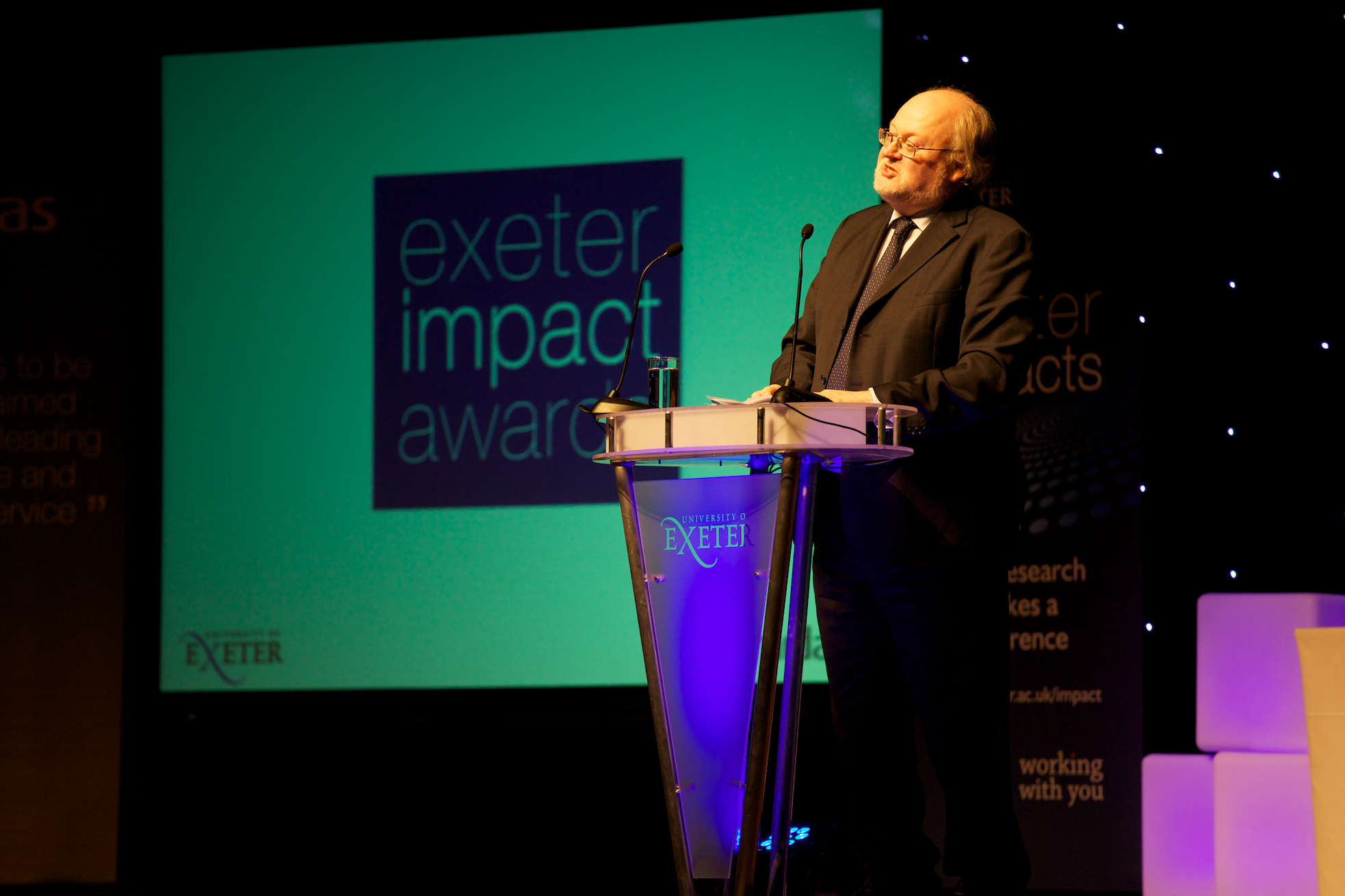
- Born: Steven Murray Smith; 4 February 1952 (age 74); Norwich, England, UK
- Title: UK Government’s International Education Champion
- Board member of: Universities UK (2006-2020); Russell Group (2012-2020); UCAS (Chair, 2013-2019)
- Spouse: Dr Jeannie Forbes (m. 2013)
- Awards: Outstanding Lifetime Achievement Award (Times Higher Education, 2025); Freedom of the City, Exeter City Council (2019); Susan Strange Award (2000)

Academic background
- Education: University of Southampton (BSc, MSc, PhD)
- Thesis: Foreign Policy Adaptation: Aspects of British and Dutch foreign Policies, 1945-1963 (1978)

Academic work
- Discipline: International relations
- Sub-discipline: Critical Security Studies
- Institutions: University of Exeter; University of Aberystwyth; University of East Anglia; Huddersfield Polytechnic

Vice-chancellor of University of Exeter
- In office 2002–2020
- Preceded by: Geoffrey Holland
- Succeeded by: Lisa Roberts

President of Universities UK
- In office 2009–2011
- Preceded by: Rick Trainor
- Succeeded by: Eric Thomas

President of International Studies Association
- In office 2003–2004
- Preceded by: John A. Vasquez
- Succeeded by: Jacek Kugler

Sir Steven Murray Smith, FAcSS, FRSA, FLSW (born 4 February 1952) is an English international relations theorist and long serving university leader. He is the former Vice Chancellor of the University of Exeter and Professor of International Studies. He was appointed as the UK Government International Education Champion in June 2020, and reappointed by the new government in August 2024. He was appointed as the UK Prime Minister's Special Representative to Saudi Arabia for Education in October 2020 and reappointed as the UK Government Special Representative to Saudi Arabia for Education in December 2024.

In November 2025 he received the outstanding lifetime achievement award by Times Higher Education. The citation stated that it is “hard to think of an academic who has had more influence on the course of UK higher education over the first quarter of this century” than Smith. “This breadth of impact put him at the heart of major policy reforms that helped to shape the university sector as we know it today.”

== Early life ==
Smith was born on 4 February 1952 in Norwich, England. He attended the City of Norwich School, then a grammar school, on Eaton Road, Norwich. His parents were from working class backgrounds. At a parents' evening, his form master told his parents about their son that "people like you don't go to university". The school afterwards suggested finding a low-skilled job for him.

Smith gained a Bachelor of Science (BSc) in Politics and International Studies in 1973, a Master of Science (MSc) degree in international studies in 1974 and a Doctor of Philosophy degree (PhD) in international relations in 1978, all from the University of Southampton.

== Academic career ==
From 1976 to 1978, Smith lectured at Huddersfield Polytechnic. From 1979 to 1992, he lectured at University of East Anglia, becoming director of the Centre for Public Choice Studies at UEA. He was a professor at the university from 1990 to 1992. From 1992 to 2002, he was senior pro vice-chancellor (academic affairs), as well as professor of international politics at University of Wales, Aberystwyth and head of the Department of International Politics.

In October 2002, he succeeded Geoffrey Holland as vice-chancellor of the University of Exeter. In the period 2003 to 2004, he was president of the International Studies Association (ISA), only the second non-American to receive this honour. Between 2006 and 2008 he was Chair of the Board of the 1994 Group. From August 2009 to August 2011, he was the President of Universities UK and remained on the board until 2020.

In 2012, Sir Steve Smith, together with the vice-chancellor of Plymouth University announced the demerger of Peninsula College of Medicine and Dentistry, and the establishment of the University of Exeter Medical School and the Plymouth University "Peninsula" Schools of Medicine and Dentistry.

Smith stepped down as vice-chancellor of University in 2020 and was succeeded by Lisa Roberts.

=== Publications ===
During his academic career, Smith has written or edited thirteen books and almost 100 academic papers. He has given over 150 academic presentations in 22 different countries. Within international relations theory, he often writes in a post-positivist vein, and has contributed articles to edited volumes on both post-modernism in international relations and Critical Security Studies. He co-authored Explaining and Understanding International Relations with the late Professor Martin Hollis.

He was the editor of the joint Cambridge University Press and British International Studies Association, Cambridge Studies in International Relations.

== Honours and awards ==
Smith was the recipient of 1999 Susan Strange Award, awarded by the International Studies Association. In 2000, he was elected as an Academician of the Social Sciences (AcSS). In April 2007, he was awarded an honorary professorship by Jilin University in China. In 2009, he was elected a Fellow of the Royal Society of Arts. He was knighted in the 2011 Queen's Birthday Honours "for services to local and national Higher Education".

Smith was recognized by University of South Florida President Judy Genshaft with the President's Global Leadership Award in May 2012.

In 2019, Exeter City Council awarded Smith with the Freedom of the City award, recognising his service to the city during his time as Vice-chancellor of University of Exeter. He was awarded an honorary LLD by the Chinese University of Hong Kong in December 2020.

In October 2022 the University of Exeter named its Living Systems Institute in honour of its former Vice-Chancellor. His portrait (by Alastair Adams, 2022) hangs in Sir Steve Smith building. The university also awarded Smith with an honorary LLD in July 2023.

In 2023, he was elected a Fellow of the Learned Society of Wales.

== Personal life ==
Smith married his partner, Dr Jeannie Forbes, in a ceremony held at University of Exeter's Reed Hall in 2013. He is a supporter of Norwich City FC.

== Bibliography ==
- Foreign Policy Adaptation, (Gower, 1981).
- Politics and Human Nature, co-edited with Ian Forbes, (Pinter, 1983).
- International Relations: British and American Approaches, (Blackwell, 1985).
- The Cold War Past and Present, co-edited with Richard Crockatt, (Allen and Unwin, 1987).
- Belief Systems and International Relations, co-edited with Richard Little, (Blackwell, 1988).
- British Foreign Policy: Tradition, Change, and Transformation, co-edited with Michael Smith and Brian White, (Unwin Hyman, 1988).
- Explaining and Understanding International Relations, with Martin Hollis, (Clarendon Press, 1990).
- Deciding Factors in British Politics, co-edited with John Greenaway and John Street, (Routledge, 1991).
- European Foreign Policy: The European Community and Changing Perspectives in Europe, co-edited with Walter Carlsnaes, (Sage, 1994).
- International Relations Theory Today, co-edited with Ken Booth, (Polity Press, 1995).
- International Theory: Positivism and Beyond, co-edited with Ken Booth and Marysia Zalewski, (Cambridge University Press, 1996).
- The Globalization of World Politics, co-edited with John Baylis and Patricia Owens (Oxford University Press, Eighth edition 2019).
- ’’Foreign Policy: Theories, Actors, Cases’’, co-edited with Tim Dunne and Amelia Hatfield (Oxford University Press, Third edition, 2016).
- ’’International Relations Theories: Discipline and Diversity’’, co-edited with Tim Dunne and Milja Kurki (Oxford University Press, Fifth edition, 2021).
- ’’Introduction to Global Politics’’, with Steve Lamy, John Baylis and Patricia Owens (Oxford University Press, Sixth edition, 2020).

Academic offices
Preceded by Sir Geoffrey Holland	Vice-Chancellor of the University of Exeter; 2002-2020;	Succeeded by Professor Lisa Roberts
