= Linda Long =

British biochemist

Linda Long is a biochemist and musician, who has combined these two fields to create what she terms molecular music.

== Life ==
Long worked as a biochemist and a research fellow in complementary medicine at Exeter University, specialising in the fields of homeopathy, herbal medicine and music therapy. Her work has been published in various medical journals, and she is an associate editor of the Journal Focus on Alternative and Complementary Therapies, published by the Royal Pharmaceutical Society of Great Britain. She has been working on molecular music since the 1990s.

She has been awarded an Invention and Innovation award over two years by NESTA. This has enabled her to develop her promotion of music in education, as well as to release two CDs of her music: Music of the Plants and Music of the Body. The award has also helped her develop an exhibit at Explore @Bristol.

== Molecular music ==
Molecular music involves the translation of the 3-dimensional positions of a protein's amino acids into note sequences. This is not an arbitrary process; x-ray crystallography data is used to relate specific musical effects such as volume and pitch to the protein's molecular structure. In this way, characteristic patterns in protein structure are heard as recognisable musical note patterns from the structural data.

This method of translating protein structures into music is said by Long to be a useful aid in understanding proteins for the visually impaired.

== Discography ==
Music of the Plants (1999) is a CD of five tracks. Conventional track titling is eschewed in favour of a description of the specific protein used for each track:

1. Pokeweed Phytolacca americana pokeweed antiviral protein
2. White mustard Sinapis alba myrosinase
3. Parsley Petroselinum crispum plastocyanin (electron transport protein)
4. Clover Trifolium repens cyanogenic β-glucosidase
5. Jimson weed Datura stramonium tropinone reductase

Music of the Body (2002) is a longer CD, and the tracks have titles related to their relevant protein's function. as the title implies, all the proteins are found in the human body.

1. Absorb and Balance – thyrotropin
2. Voice of Metabolism – thyroid hormone
3. Calcium Chimes – parathyroid hormone
4. Mineral Replenish – guanylin
5. Growth Control – somatostatin
6. Music for Muscle and Bone – growth hormone
7. Inner Cycles – progesterone receptor protein
8. Nurture – chorionic gonadotrophin
9. Fertility – Follitropin

== See also ==
- The molecular music website
- NESTA award
- A list of other scientists doing similar work
- Hypnotherapy using molecular music
