= Phil Cameron =

British businessman

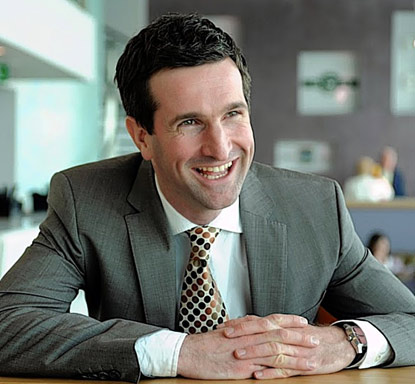
- Born: 14 November 1972 (age 53); Paddington, London
- Occupation: Entrepreneur

Phil Cameron (born 14 November 1972) is a British entrepreneur, the founder of No.1 Traveller, and a former Tony and Olivier Award-winning theatre producer.

== Personal life ==
Cameron was born on 14 November 1972 in London. He read English and Drama at the University of Exeter before becoming a theatre manager and ultimately a producer.

== Career as theatre producer ==
Cameron’s first major play was Top Girls, in 2000. He went on to produce Another Country, Mother Clap's Molly House, This Is Our Youth, King Lear, Why the Whales Came, Someone Who'll Watch Over Me, As You Like It, Twelfth Night and Journey's End, which won a Tony Award on Broadway in 2007. In 2005, he won a Laurence Olivier Award for Best Revival for his production of Hamlet.

== No.1 Traveller ==
After initially attempting to set up an airline which would cater exclusively for business passengers, he founded No.1 Traveller in 2006. The company specialises in airport lounges and other pre-flight services, the first lounge was opened at JFK International Airport, Terminal 4 and was branded, "The Lounge".

Since then, the company has opened eight UK airport lounges: a Flagship lounge at Heathrow Terminal 3, the North and South Terminals at Gatwick Airport, the company’s first lounge outside London, at Birmingham, and Edinburgh, which opened in 2015 and three others. It planned to open 24 by the end of 2020. The company also provides chauffeur driven airport transfers to its London airports and operates Travel Spas at Gatwick and Heathrow airports. In September 2011 it opened 12 airside bedrooms at Heathrow Terminal 3 and introduced a wide range of 'Driveway to Runway' products, including airport parking, express trains, a VIP departure service, and a range of associate lounges around the world.

In October 2015, the company opened up Clubrooms, a collection of four VIP lounges available for private bookings at Gatwick South. This followed the July 2014 launch of My Lounge, a lower-price alternative to their main lounge at Gatwick North.
