= Manuel Barange =

Spanish biologist

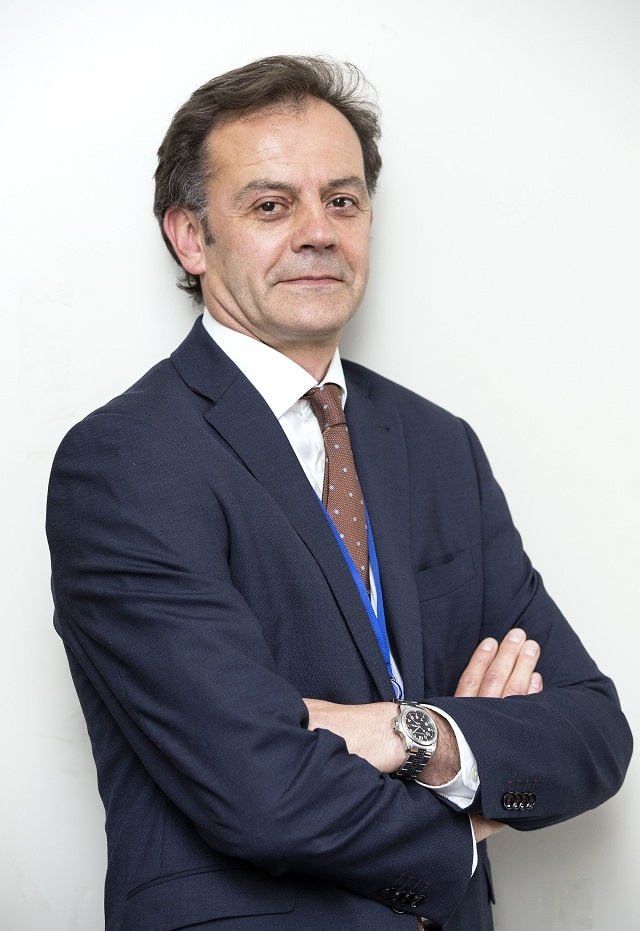
Manuel Barange

Manuel Barange is a biologist. He is Assistant Director General of the Food and Agriculture Organization of the United Nations and Director of its Fisheries and Aquaculture Division. He is an honorary professor at the University of Exeter, UK and visiting professor at the Yellow Sea Fisheries Research Institute, China. Barange was the Deputy Chief Executive Officer and Director of Science at the Plymouth Marine Laboratory and the chair of the scientific committee of the International Council for the Exploration of the Sea. From 2000 to 2010 he was the Director of the International Project Office of GLOBEC Global Ocean Ecosystem Dynamics, one of the first ever large programmes working on climate change and marine systems.

Dr Barange obtained his Bachelor of Science degree in Biology (majoring in Zoology and Ecology) in 1986 from the University of Barcelona, Spain. He conducted his PhD in Marine Ecology at the Sea Fisheries Research Institute (SFRI) in Cape Town, South Africa, awarded by the University of Barcelona to allow the late Prof Ramon Margalef be the Chair of his award committee. He did post-doctoral research on Antarctic krill at the Sea Fisheries Research Institute, Cape Town, South Africa, where he remained a Specialist Scientist and Head of the Surveys and Fish Behaviour Division until 2000.

== Awards and honors ==
In 2010, Barange was awarded the Roger Revelle Medal by the Intergovernmental Oceanographic Commission. for his contributions to marine science. His colleague E. Macpherson named the New Caledonian decapod Munida Barangei in his honour. Other members of the Macpherson team working on Namibian fisheries in the 1990s were equally honoured. He is a member of the Editorial Board of the African Journal of Marine Science.
