= Peter Cox (climatologist) =

Peter Michael Cox CBE is professor of Climate System Dynamics within the Mathematics and Statistics department at the University of Exeter. He is also the director of the Global Systems Institute. Until 2006 he was the Science Director - Climate Change at the Centre for Ecology and Hydrology, and before that he worked at the Hadley Centre for Climate Prediction and Research (1990–2004).

He is particularly noted for his work introducing fully interactive carbon cycling into the UK Met Office Hadley Centre's climate and Earth System models, with early predictions suggesting significant feedback between the terrestrial biosphere and atmospheric CO_{2} concentration.

Cox was awarded the CBE in the 2025 Birthday Honours for services to science and to climate modelling.
