= Learning and Skills Development Agency =

Defunct UK government agency

The Learning and Skills Development Agency (LSDA) was a publicly funded body in the United Kingdom that supported further education in England. At the end of March 2006 its functions were divided into the Quality Improvement Agency (QIA) and the Learning and Skills Network (LSN) and its trading subsidiary, Inspire Learning, better known by its brand name the Centre for Excellence in Leadership was spun-out. Inspire Leadership and QIA were re-absorbed into the same corporate entity, the Learning and Skills Improvement Service on 1 October 2008.

Before November 2000 it was known as the Further Education Development Agency (FEDA). FEDA was established in 1995 to support the further education community in England, as a result of a merger between the Further Education Unit and the Staff College.

The role of the LSDA was to support post-16 education in England, Wales and Northern Ireland (but not in Scotland, where there is a different organisational framework for education).

In Wales the organisation was known as Dysg. It was absorbed into the Welsh Assembly Government. LSDA Northern Ireland continued as a subsidiary company of LSN. In 2006, the organization was disbanded into Quality Improvement Agency and Learning and Skills Network.
