= Trade Knowledge Network =

Swiss-based research institution network

- Abbreviation: TKN
- Formation: 1997
- Headquarters: 1219 Geneva, Switzerland
- Region served: Worldwide
- Members: 15+
- Parent organization: International Institute for Sustainable Development

The Trade Knowledge Network is a global collaboration of research institutions from Africa, Asia, Europe, and the Americas, focused on promoting sustainable development through supportive trade and investment policies. Coordinated by the International Institute for Sustainable Development (IISD) since 1998, TKN aims to build long-term capacity in developing countries by enhancing awareness, knowledge, and understanding of trade-related issues among research institutions, non-governmental organizations, and governments. With over a decade of experience, TKN generates innovative policy analysis that addresses the impacts of trade and investment on sustainable development, distinguishing itself from the Trade Knowledge Exchange, which specifically analyzes post-Brexit trade issues in the UK and globally.

== Objective ==
TKN is composed of research and policy institutions in Africa, Asia, Europe, North and South America that are exploring the connection between trade and sustainable development and working to ensure that increased international trade can contribute to sustainable development in their countries and regions. The goal of the Trade Knowledge Network is to foster long-term capacity to address the complex issues of trade and sustainable development in partner-country research institutions, governments and the wider policy community, including business, academia, and environment and development NGOs.

The Trade Knowledge Network has four inter-related objectives to achieve this goal:

- To produce objective, high quality, country- and region-specific policy and thematic research on trade policy and practice issues that present challenges or opportunities for achieving sustainable development in developing countries;
- To inform and engage trade policy-makers and promote dialogue among stakeholders to incorporate sustainable development into trade negotiations, policy promulgation and trade practice;
- To build the capacity of TKN Partner organizations to integrate sustainable development priorities into trade policy and practice through demand-driven training; South-South and north–south joint and cooperative research and policy engagement activities; and exchange and placement of young researchers and interns at TKN Partner organizations; and
- To facilitate through the Trade Knowledge Network, its partners and among broader audiences globally, exchange of information, best policy and practice on trade and sustainable development.

== Structure ==
The Trade Knowledge Network is managed collaboratively by the International Institute for Sustainable Development

Representatives of TKN partner institutions met at an inception meeting in 2000 and will hold a wrap-up meeting at a conference featuring the dissemination of research results. Partners communicate with each other on an ongoing basis primarily through the network's electronic mailing list.

Partner institutions selected the TKN research topics based on what was most relevant for their specific countries and regions. The research focuses on large economic sectors or sectors that have the potential to promote sustainable development.

Published opinions are solely those of the authors and are intended to stimulate focused discussion on issues of trade and sustainable development.

The Trade Knowledge Network gives members to opportunity and resources to explore trade issues that are important to national and regional development and to examine these through the lens of sustainable development. The research provides important capacity building opportunities that will enable decision-makers and policy-makers to incorporate sustainable development issues into national trade and development policy.

TKN is supported by the Rockefeller Foundation; the Norwegian Ministry of Foreign Affairs; the International Development Research Centre; the Swiss Agency for Development and Cooperation ; and the Canadian International Development Agency.

== Members ==
Trade Knowledge Network has 20 member institutions located in eight countries: Argentina, Bangladesh, China, Chile, Costa Rica, Pakistan, South Africa and Vietnam.

=== Member Institution ===
- Brandeis University, USA.
- Centro de Investigaciones para la Transformación (CENIT), Argentina.
- Centre for Environmental Investigation and Planning (CIPMA), Chile.
- Chinese Academy of International Trade and Economic Cooperation (CAITEC)
- CUTS International, India.
- East West University, Bangladesh.
- El Colegio de México, A.C. (PROCIENTEC), Mexico.
- International Centre of Economic Policy for Sustainable Development (CINPE), Costa Rica.
- Ministry of Fisheries (MOFI), Vietnam.
- Ministry of Science, Technology and Environment (MOSTE), Vietnam.
- North South University, Bangladesh.
- Policy Research Centre for Environment and Economy (PRCEE), China.
- Programa Salvadoreño de Investigación Sobre Desarrolloy Medio Ambiente (PRISMA), El Salvador.
- Recursos e Investigación para el Desarrollo Sustentable (RIDES), Chile.
- South Asia Watch on Trade, Economics & Environment (SAWTEE), South Asia.
- Sustainable Development Policy Institute (SDPI), Pakistan.
- The Global Development And Environment Institute (GDAE), USA.
- Trade and Industrial Policy Strategies (TIPS), South Africa.
- The World Conservation Union (IUCN)
