= Hind Abdul Rahman al-Muftah =

Qatari academic, researcher, and politician

Permanent Representative of Qatar to the United Nations Office at Geneva
- In office 2022–

Member of the Consultative Assembly
- In office 2017–2021

Hind Bint Abdul Rahman al-Muftah (Arabic: هند عبد الرحمن المفتاح) is a Qatari academic, researcher, politician, and diplomat. In 2017 she was one of four women appointed to the Consultative Assembly, becoming one of the country's first female parliamentarians. In June 2022 she was appointed as a Permanent Representative of Qatar to the United Nations Office at Geneva.

== Biography ==
After leaving school, al-Muftah planned to study medicine at the Arabian Gulf University in Bahrain as the subject was not taught at Qatar University at the time. However, following a last-minute change of heart, she decided to study public administration at Qatar University. She was subsequently appointed as a teaching assistant at the university, and went on to obtain a master's degree and then a PhD at the University of Exeter in the United Kingdom in 2004.

After completing her doctorate, al-Muftah became an HR manager at Qatar University until 2008. In 2020 she became an advisor to the Minister of Commerce, and in 2012 began working Qatar Rail, later becoming an associate professor and Vice President of Financial and Administrative Affairs at the Doha Institute for Graduate Studies, where she lectures in the School of Public Administration and Development Economics. She also became president of the Library and Information Society of Qatar.

Al-Muftah was appointed to the Consultative Council in November 2017 by Emir Tamim bin Hamad Al Thani. In June 2022 she was appointed Permanent Representative of Qatar to the United Nations Office at Geneva. She lost a bid to become chair of the UN Forum on Human Rights, Democracy and the Rule of Law in 2022, after it was revealed that she had made a series of antisemitic and homophobic comments.
