= Carolina Soto Losada =

Deputy Minister of Finance in Colombia (2013–15)

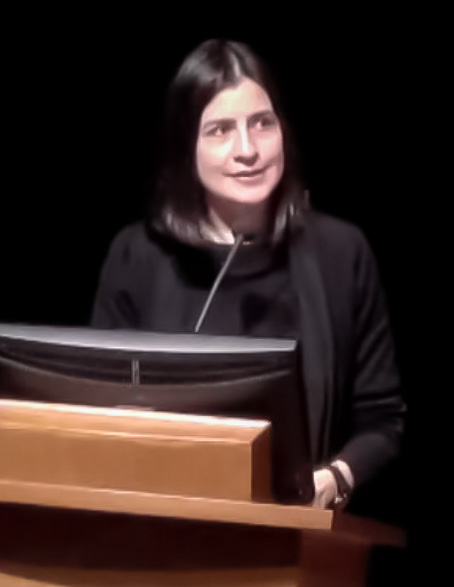
- Soto in 2022

Deputy Minister of Finance and Public Credit of Colombia
- In office 5 March 2013 – 1 July 2015
- President: Juan Manuel Santos Calderón
- Preceded by: Germán Arce Zapata

Personal details
- Spouse: Alejandro Gaviria Uribe (-present)
- Education: University of the Andes (BEcon, 1996; MEcon, 1997); Columbia University (MPP, 2002)
- Profession: Economist

Carolina Soto Losada is the former High Presidential Counsellor for Government, Private Sector and Competitiveness of Colombia. Before holding that position, she was Deputy Minister of Finance and Public Credit of Colombia. She is married to Alejandro Gaviria Uribe, the former Minister of Health and Social Protection of Colombia.

== Career ==
On 5 March 2012, President Juan Manuel Santos Calderón appointed Soto as Deputy Minister of Finance and Public Credit of Colombia.

== Selected works ==
- Steiner Sampedro, Roberto Ricardo; Soto Losada, Carolina (1999). Cinco Ensayos Sobre Tributación en Colombia. Cuadernos de Fedesarrollo, 6 (in Spanish). Bogotá: Fedesarrollo. ISBN 9789586018272. OCLC 43408910.
