= Mark Bamford (cricketer) =

English cricketer

Mark Bamford (born 2 June 1980) is an English cricketer. He is a right-handed opening batsman and a right-arm off-break bowler who has played for Shropshire. He was born in Wolverhampton.

Bamford, who represented Northamptonshire's Second XI on a number of occasions between 1998 and 1999, made his debut for Shropshire in the Minor Counties Championship the following season and played his last game in 2003 when he moved to Sussex.

Bamford made a single List A appearance for the team, against Oxfordshire in September 2001.

Bamford represented Shropshire at U12-U15 and for Staffordshire at U16, 17 & 19 levels. In that time, he averaged 110.5 at U14, 105.8 at U16, and 71 at U17 in county cricket. He also represented Derbyshire Colts in 1996. He represented the Midlands at U14/15 & 19 (career average of 68.4) and for England Schools XI(ESCA) at U15 level in 1995. He scored 123 not out v Wales U15 in 1995 & 137 not out v Australia U15 in 1996. Bamford was named MCCC Young Player of the Year in 1996.

Bamford attended Exeter University (1998–2001) and played for their 1st XI as vice captain whilst studying for his Geography degree. He then moved on to Southampton University to complete teacher training and played for their 1st XI too.

Bamford, an ECB Level 2 coach, captained Chichester Priory Park CC from 2009–2012 in the Sussex Premier League and was a member of their side that won the championship in 2005 (he was the highest run scorer in the championship winning side). He has previously played for Wolverhampton CC, Perkins CC, Shrewsbury CC (where at 17 was the youngest captain in premier league history) and Wroxeter CC.

Bamford now works at Oaklands Catholic School in Waterlooville, Hampshire, as a Geography Teacher, and a member of Senior Leadership Team. He has worked there since 2002.
