= Adrian Currie =

- Occupation: Senior Lecturer
- Known for: Philosophy of palaeontology and of geosciences
- Awards: Fernando Gil Prize 2019

Academic background
- Education: Victoria University of Wellington

Academic work
- Discipline: Philosophy of Science
- Sub-discipline: Philosophy of Historical Sciences
- Institutions: University of Exeter

Adrian Currie is a philosopher of science in the department of Social and Political Sciences, Philosophy, and Anthropology at the University of Exeter, UK. Currie's work is on the history and philosophy of historical sciences, especially geology, palaeontology, and archeology. Currie's book Rock, Bone and Ruin: An Optimist’s Guide to the Historical Sciences (2018, MIT) was awarded the Fernando Gil Prize in 2019.

== Selected works ==
- Comparative Thinking in Biology, Cambridge University Press, 2020
- Scientific Knowledge and the Deep Past, Cambridge University Press, 2019
- Rock, Bone and Ruin: An Optimist’s Guide to the Historical Sciences, MIT, 2018
