= Tropinone reductase II =

Class of enzymes

tropinone reductase

Identifiers
- EC no.: 1.1.1.236
- CAS no.: 136111-61-0

Databases
- BRENDA: enzyme data
- ExPASy: NiceZyme view
- KEGG: enzyme entry
- MetaCyc: metabolic pathway
- Rhea: reactions
- PDB structures: RCSB PDB PDBe PDBsum
- Gene Ontology: AmiGO / QuickGO
Search
- PMC: articles
- PubMed: articles
- NCBI: proteins

In enzymology, a tropinone reductase II (EC 1.1.1.236) is an enzyme that catalyzes the chemical reaction

pseudotropine + NADP^{+} $\rightleftharpoons$ tropinone + NADPH + H^{+}

Thus, the two substrates of this enzyme are pseudotropine and NADP^{+}, whereas its 3 products are tropinone, NADPH, and H^{+}.

This enzyme belongs to the family of oxidoreductases, specifically those acting on the CH-OH group of donor with NAD^{+} or NADP^{+} as acceptor. The systematic name of this enzyme class is pseudotropine:NADP^{+} 3-oxidoreductase. Other names in common use include tropinone (psi-tropine-forming) reductase, pseudotropine forming tropinone reductase, tropinone reductase (ambiguous), and TR-II. This enzyme participates in alkaloid biosynthesis ii.

== Structural studies ==
As of late 2007, 6 structures have been solved for this class of enzymes, with PDB accession codes PDB: 1AE1, PDB: 1IPE, PDB: 1IPF, PDB: 1XHL, PDB: 2AE1, and PDB: 2AE2.
