= East West University =

Public University in Bangladesh

- ইস্ট ওয়েস্ট ইউনিভার্সিটি
- Crest of East West University
- Other name: EWU
- Motto: Excellence in Education
- Type: Private research university
- Established: 1996; 30 years ago
- Accreditation: UGC; ACBSP; BAETE; WA
- Affiliations: USAID; BLINK
- Academic affiliations: MQ; AIT; ESU; CFA; ICSB; BICM; ICMAB; ICAB; IEB; ACCA; PCB; BBC
- Chancellor: President Mirza Fakhrul Islam Alamgir
- Vice-Chancellor: Vacant
- Location: A/2, Jahurul Islam Avenue, Jahurul Islam City, Aftab Nagar, Dhaka, 1212, Bangladesh; 23.7687°N 90.4256°E
- Campus: Urban
- Language: English
- Colors
- Website: www.ewubd.edu

University rankings

Global – Overall
- QS World: 1401+ (2026)
- THE World: 1501+ (2026)

Regional – Overall
- QS Asia: 491 (2026)

East West University, abbreviated as EWU, is a private research university in Aftab Nagar, Dhaka, Bangladesh. It was established in 1996 under the Private University Act of 1992.

It has established centres to support students in developing entrepreneurial skills and launching their own ventures. The university also operates a range of facilities, including libraries and research centers.

== History ==
East West University was established in 1996 as a non-profit organization. Classes began in September 1996 with 6 faculty members and 20 students at the campus located at 43 Mohakhali Dhaka.

== Administration ==
=== List of vice-chancellors ===
- Shams Rahman, 6th Vice-Chancellor.

== Academics ==
East West University has three academic faculties. Each faculty has departments. A dean is the head of each faculty, while departments are headed by chairpersons. The Department of Business Administration is the largest and one of the oldest departments of the university. The Department of Computer Science and the Department of English are the two other founding departments.

Faculty of Science & Engineering	Faculty of Liberal Arts & Social Sciences	Faculty of Business & Economics
Department of Computer Science & Engineering	Department of English	Department of Business Administration
Department of Electrical and Electronic Engineering	Department of Law	Department of Economics
Department of Genetic Engineering and Biotechnology	Department of Social Relations	
Department of Civil Engineering	Department of Information Studies	
Department of Mathematical and Physical Sciences	Department of Sociology	
Department of Pharmacy		

=== Grading System ===
Most degrees from East West University, particularly in business and engineering, are transferable to universities in North America, Europe, and Australasia where formal collaborations exist. East West University evaluates graduates based on their Cumulative Grade Point Average (CGPA) on a scale of 0 to 4 points. The university classifies students into three categories based on their earned CGPA.

- First Class: CGPA of 3.00 and above
- Second Class: CGPA between 2.50 and 2.99
- Third Class: CGPA between 2.00 and 2.49

Class Intervals of Scores	Letter Grade	Grade Points
80 – 100	A+	4.00
75 – 79	A	3.75
70 – 74	A-	3.50
65 – 69	B+	3.25
60 – 64	B	3.00
55 – 59	B-	2.75
50 – 54	C+	2.50
45 – 49	C	2.25
40 – 44	D	2.00
Less than 40	F	0.00
---	I	Incomplete
---	W	Withdrawn
---	X	Continuation

The university offers the following awards to recognize the achievements of its exceptional students

- Gold Medal: The Chancellor of East West University awards a gold medal to each student who achieves a CGPA of 3.97 or above on the day of convocation.
- Summa Cum Laude: Each undergraduate student with a CGPA of 3.90 or above is awarded the title of summa cum laude by the university, as announced by the convocation marshal on the day of convocation.
- Magna Cum Laude: Each undergraduate student with a CGPA of 3.75 or above is awarded the title of magna cum laude by the university, also announced by the convocation marshal on the day of convocation.

=== Term dates ===
East West University operates on the North American Open Credit system and maintains a tri-semester academic year, with the exception of the Department of Pharmacy, which follows a bi-semester system. (Note: These dates may change due to any changes that occur in the academic calendar provided by East West University Authorities.)

- Spring Semester: January – June (starting on the third week of January)
- Summer Semester: July – September (starting on the fourth week of July)
- Fall Semester: September – December (starting on the second week of September)

=== Scholarships & Assistance ===
East West University offers a variety of scholarships and financial assistance to support students. The university provides merit scholarships that range from full funding to partial tuition waivers. Each semester, the top 10% of students in each batch with a CGPA of 3.97 or above are awarded the EWU Merit Scholarships, valued at 90,000 BDT for undergraduate students and 75,000 BDT for postgraduate students. Additionally, students on the Dean's List are eligible for the Medha Lalon Fund Scholarship, which ranges from 25,000 BDT to 500,000 BDT. The university also offers 28 directorial scholarships each year, valued between 20,000 BDT and 25,000 BDT, for meritorious students with exceptional cases.

For financial aid, students facing financial difficulties, with a CGPA of 3.7 and above, who have completed at least 30 credits in the last three semesters, can apply once a year for support. The financial aid varies from 18,000 BDT to 35,000 BDT. East West University provides a 50% tuition waiver for one sibling pair studying simultaneously at the university, which is worth around 45,000 BDT per year. The university maintains a low tuition fee rate of 4,900 BDT per credit, which varies by department.

== Research ==
In 2002, East West University organized the International Conference on Computer and Information Technology, which is part of a series of conferences focused on Computer Science and Information Technology hosted in Bangladesh since 1997 by different universities each year. East West University is a member of the Trade Knowledge Network, a collaboration of research institutions in developed and developing countries across Africa, Asia, Europe, and the Americas. The university is also active in the South Asian Network for Development and Environmental Economists (SANDEE).

== Ranking ==
In 2025, according to the QS World University Rankings, East West University is ranked between 1401 and 1500 globally. In 2020, EWU was ranked 3549 in the world and 14th among the 166 universities in Bangladesh by the Webometrics Ranking of World Universities. This ranking is based on the university's web presence and visibility.

According to the IDEAS ranking of Economic Research Institutions in Bangladesh, the Department of Economics at East West University has consistently ranked 1st in the country since 2014. The IDEAS database includes information on 13,177 economics institutions, 43,324 authors, and over 1,046,994 research publications across 94 fields.

== Campus ==
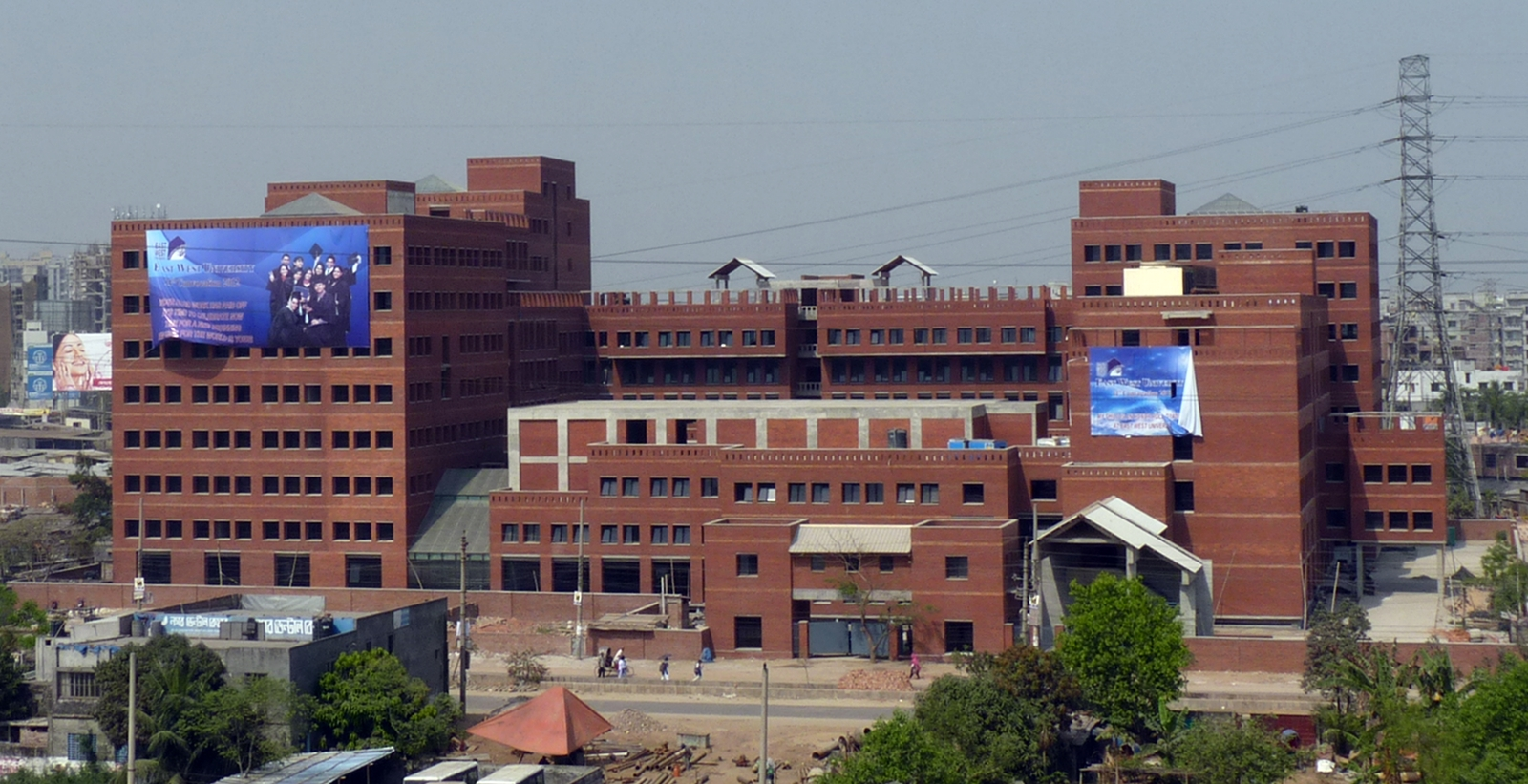

In May 2012 the university moved to its permanent campus on Jahurul Islam Avenue, Jahurul Islam City, Aftabnagar, Dhaka, Bangladesh, on Pragati Sarani, and covers 7.4 bighas of land. The total floor area of the nine-story university complex is 458,957.04 square feet.

== Notable people ==
=== Alumni ===
- Rubana Huq is a Bangladeshi businesswoman, academic and was featured in the BBC 100 Women list.
- Afran Nisho is a Bangladeshi actor, story writer, and playback singer.
- Sadia Ayman is a Bangladeshi actress known for her work in television dramas and Dhallywood cinema.
- Redoan Rony is a Bangladeshi film director and CEO of Chorki and won the Bangladesh National Film Award for Best Dialogue for his debut film, Chorabali.
- Rifat Nabi is a Bangladeshi software engineer and co-founder of Avro Keyboard. He received the Ekushey Padak on 20 February 2025, along with Mehdi Hasan Khan as part of the Avro team.

=== Faculty ===
- Salimullah Khan is a Bangladeshi writer and academic known for his exploration of politics and culture through Marxist and Lacanian theories.
- Tonima Hamid is a Bangladeshi model, actress, and teacher from Mymensingh, Bangladesh.

== See also ==
- Education in Bangladesh
- Universities in Bangladesh
- List of universities in Bangladesh
