= Tom Stayt =

English cricketer

Personal information
- Full name: Thomas Patrick Stayt
- Born: 20 January 1986 (age 40); Salisbury, Wiltshire, England
- Batting: Right-handed
- Bowling: Right-arm medium-fast

Domestic team information
- Years: Team
- 2007–2009: Gloucestershire

Career statistics
Competition	First-class	List A
Matches	4	4
Runs scored	45	1
Batting average	15.00	0.50
100s/50s	–/–	–/–
Top score	36	1
Balls bowled	558	113
Wickets	6	3
Bowling average	49.16	43.33
5 wickets in innings	–	–
10 wickets in match	–	–
Best bowling	3/51	2/51
Catches/stumpings	2/–	1/–
- Source: Cricinfo, 22 September 2011

Thomas Patrick Stayt (born 20 January 1986) is an English cricketer. Stayt is a right-handed batsman who bowls right-arm medium-fast. He was born in Salisbury, Wiltshire and later undertook further education at Exeter University.

One of the first graduates of the Gloucestershire cricket academy, where he spent four years, Stayt made his debut for Gloucestershire in a first-class match against Middlesex in the 2007 County Championship, claiming his maiden first-class wicket in the match when he dismissed Andrew Strauss. He made two further first-class appearances in the 2007 season against Leicestershire and Middlesex. In 2008, he made his List A debut against Somerset in the 2008 Friends Provident Trophy. The following season he made three further List A appearances for Gloucestershire in the 2009 Friends Provident Trophy. In his four List A matches, he took 3 wickets at an average of 43.33, with best figures of 2/51. During the 2009 season, he played his last first-class match against Leicestershire in the County Championship, which was also his first since 2007. In his total of four first-class matches, he took 6 wickets at an average of 49.16, with best figures of 3/51. He was released by Gloucestershire at the end of the 2009 season and currently works as a personal trainer in Bath, Somerset.
