= Averroes International School Mirpur =

Private school in Dhaka, Bangladesh

- Averroes International School Mirpur, EIIN No:190163; 19/6, Pallabi, Section 12, Mirpur, Dhaka-1216; Averroes International School Uttara, EIIN No:190164; House #3, Road #7, Sector #7, Uttara, Dhaka 1230; Bangladesh

Information
- Type: Islamic English Medium School
- Motto: One School Serving the Purposes of Here and Hereafter
- Established: 2017
- School district: Dhaka
- Head of school: Mohammad Anisur Rahaman Shohagh
- Faculty: 300
- Grades: Play Group to A level
- Enrollment: 2000
- Website: averroes.edu.bd

Averroes International School Mirpur is listed under the Board of Intermediate and Secondary Education, Dhaka.

The institution offers education aligned with international curricula, including Pearson Edexcel and Cambridge Assessment International Education.

Averroes International School has also been featured in national media for its academic activities and institutional development.

Averroes International School (Mirpur & Uttara) is a private English-medium educational institution in Dhaka, Bangladesh. Established in 2017, the school offers education based on the British curriculum, integrated with Islamic studies, including Hifzul Quran programmes. The institution operates campuses in the Mirpur and Uttara areas of Dhaka and provides schooling across multiple grade levels, from early years to advanced levels.

History and Administration: The institution was founded in 2017 and is led by its founder, chairman, and head of school, Mohammad Anisur Rahaman Shohagh. Under his administration, the institution oversees a workforce of over 300 personnel and serves a student body of approximately 2,000 as of 2025.

Academics and Curriculum: The school provides education ranging from early years (Play Group) through to GCE Advanced Level (A Level). The academic program places an emphasis on Science, Technology, Engineering, and Mathematics (STEM) education alongside a religious curriculum. The institution fosters an environment where students pursue both secular and religious knowledge.

Affiliations and Recognition: Averroes International School Mirpur is officially recognized by the Ministry of Education and the Board of Intermediate and Secondary Education, Dhaka. It acts as a partner school of the British Council Bangladesh. The institution is an approved examination centre for both Pearson Edexcel and Cambridge Assessment International Education (CAIE).

== Cultural activities ==
Every year school celebrates the National Days to pay tribute to the National Heroes. The school holds events to pay tribute to the Freedom Fighters of Liberation War of Bangladesh. School organises month long activities in the month of Victory. Independence Day & International Mother Language Day are also celebrated with the participation of huge number of students through different types of events.
