= Quality Improvement Agency =

The Quality Improvement Agency (QIA) was a non-departmental public body of the United Kingdom government whose remit was to support those institutions that provide education, but which are not schools or universities. This covers a broad range of institutions, ranging from further education colleges, prison education to workplace training and various other types of education and training.

The QIA was created in March 2006 from the Learning and Skills Development Agency. The majority of the assets and liabilities of the QIA were transferred to the Learning and Skills Improvement Service, a new not-for-profit, sector owned improvement body for the further education sector on 1 October 2008.

== Staff ==
There was one chair of trustees during the lifetime of the QIA, Sir Geoffrey Holland.

The QIA had two chief executives - Andrew Thomson and Dr Kate Anderson.
