= Banasree =

Residential area of Dhaka

Coordinates: 23°45′41″N 90°26′06″E

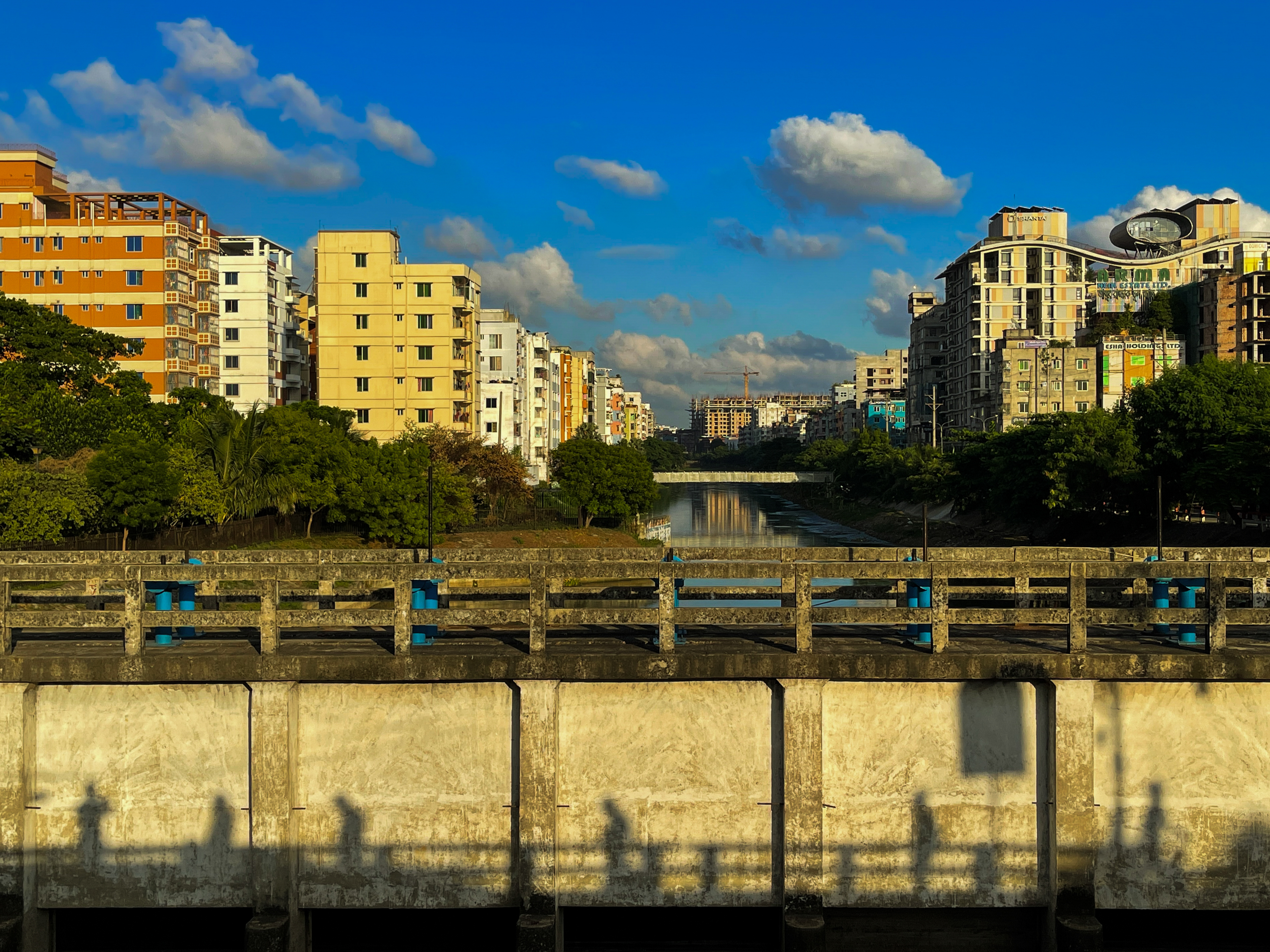
Banasree in 2022

Banasree is a residential area of Dhaka in Bangladesh which has been developed by Eastern Housing Limited.

The word "Banasree" means "Beauty of the Forest".
