= Learning and Skills Improvement Service =

The Learning and Skills Improvement Service (LSIS) was a not-for-profit company limited by guarantee and registered charity formed in 2008 to support and improve achievement in the Further Education and Skills sector in England.

The LSIS had a governing Council and a management board, both chaired by Dame Ruth Silver DBE, formerly principal of Lewisham College. Its chief executive was Rob Wye.

In July 2012, the LSIS launched a new scheme to support trainee teachers, the Initial Teacher Training (ITT) Fee Awards.

On Monday 10 December 2012 it was confirmed that LSIS would begin a managed exit from its delivery of improvement services for the further education and skills sector, with the intention of closing by 31 July 2013. This decision was in light of the announcement that funding of LSIS by BIS would cease by 1 August 2013.
