= Paul S. Freemont =

Structural and synthetic biologist

Paul S. Freemont FRSB FRSC
- Born: Paul Simon Freemont
- Education: Heriot-Watt University; University of Aberdeen (PhD)
- Scientific career
- Fields: Structural biology, synthetic biology, engineering biology
- Workplaces: Imperial College London; Imperial Cancer Research Fund; Yale University
- Thesis: Complete amino acid sequence of human skeletal muscle aldolase (1984)
- Doctoral advisor: John E. Fothergill; Linda Fothergill-Gilmore
- Other academic advisors: Thomas A. Steitz
- Website: profiles.imperial.ac.uk/p.freemont

Paul Simon Freemont is a British biochemist and academic specialising in structural biology, synthetic biology and engineering biology. He is professor and chair of structural and synthetic biology at Imperial College London, where he directs the London Biofoundry and co-directs SynbiCITE, the United Kingdom's Innovation and Knowledge Centre for Synthetic Biology. Since 2024, he has also served as vice-director of Imperial's Bezos Earth Fund Centre for Sustainable Proteins.

== Education ==
Freemont studied biochemistry at Heriot-Watt University in Edinburgh, receiving an honours degree in 1980. He then undertook doctoral research in the Department of Biochemistry at the University of Aberdeen. His thesis, completed in 1984 under the supervision of John and Linda Fothergill, was titled Complete amino acid sequence of human skeletal muscle aldolase.

== Career ==
From 1984 to 1987, Freemont was a postdoctoral fellow in the Department of Molecular Biophysics and Biochemistry at Yale University, where he worked under Thomas A. Steitz. He joined the Imperial Cancer Research Fund in 1988 as a research scientist and became a principal scientist in 1994, remaining there until 1999.

At Imperial College London, Freemont headed the Centre for Structural Biology from 2000 to 2005 and the Division of Molecular Biosciences from 2005 to 2012. He co-founded and co-directed the Engineering and Physical Sciences Research Council Centre for Synthetic Biology and Innovation from 2009 to 2014. In 2013, he co-founded SynbiCITE, the UK's Innovation and Knowledge Centre for Synthetic Biology, and became its co-director.

Freemont was head of Imperial's Section of Structural and Synthetic Biology from 2014 to 2025. He became director of the London Biofoundry in 2016 and vice-director of the Bezos Earth Fund Centre for Sustainable Proteins in 2024.

In 2019, Freemont co-founded the Global Biofoundries Alliance and served as its founding chair. He later chaired the international Task Force on Engineering Biology Metrics and Technical Standards for the Global Bioeconomy, which published its report in May 2024. As of 2026, he is also a member of the World Economic Forum's Global Future Council on Generative Biology.

From 2023 until the body was renamed in January 2025, Freemont was a member of the UK government's Biosecurity Leadership Council. As of 2026, he co-chairs the government's Engineering Biology Advisory Panel.

=== Structural and synthetic biology ===
Freemont's academic work has combined structural biology with the development of synthetic- and engineering-biology research programmes. His institutional work at Imperial College London has included the Centre for Synthetic Biology and Innovation, SynbiCITE and the London Biofoundry.

His translational activities have included co-founding Solena Materials, an Imperial College spin-out company, and SynBioVen, an early-stage investment vehicle for engineering-biology companies.

Freemont was the subject editor of Mammalian Synthetic Biology, a volume in Oxford University Press's Oxford Biology Primers series. He also co-edited Synthetic Biology—A Primer with Richard I. Kitney.

== Research ==
During Freemont's PhD research in the laboratory of Linda Fothergill at the Department of Biochemistry, University of Aberdeen, Freemont worked on the protein sequencing of two metabolic enzymes, human skeletal-muscle fructose-bisphosphate aldolase and chicken skeletal-muscle enolase.

In 1984, Freemont started a postdoctoral research position in the laboratory of Thomas Steitz and worked on the X-ray crystallographic structure of DNA polymerase I and its Klenow fragment, including complexes formed with DNA. This research concerned the enzyme's polymerase and 3′–5′ exonuclease active sites and the editing complex formed with DNA. In collaboration with Nigel Grindley, Graham Hatfull and Mark Sanderson, he also worked on the X-ray crystallographic structure of the site-specific recombination enzyme γδ-resolvase.

Upon returning to Britain in 1987, Freemont joined the Imperial Cancer Research Fund laboratories at Lincoln's Inn Fields. There he studied a wide spectrum of proteins, protein complexes and enzymological problems, ranging from DNA-repair proteins such as AP endonuclease and the XRCC1 BRCT domain in collaboration with Tomas Lindahl's group, to structure–function studies of the promyelocytic leukemia protein and the characterization of the RING finger. His subsequent work examined the structure and organization of PML nuclear bodies, SUMO modification, transcriptional regulation and ubiquitin-mediated protein degradation.

After moving to Imperial College London in 2000, Freemont engaged in research on a wide range of enzymological problems, including structure and function studies of the p97 ATPase and its adaptor protein p47, as well as DNA-repair systems in Neisseria meningitidis in collaboration with Geoff Baldwin's group. His research on p97/VCP examined its ATPase cycle, conformational changes and interactions with adaptor proteins including p47, Ufd1–Npl4, FAF1 and UBXD1. This work addressed the roles of p97 in protein quality control, the assembly of the endoplasmic reticulum and Golgi apparatus, and the ubiquitin–proteasome system. Related structural studies investigated the type VI secretion system, cyclic di-AMP signalling, lipoteichoic acid synthesis and bacterial DNA repair.

From the late 2000s, an increasing part of Freemont's research focused on synthetic biology. His group developed computational and experimental methods for designing, assembling and testing genetic constructs, including modular DNA-assembly systems and in vitro methods for rapidly prototyping promoters and other regulatory elements. It also developed and applied cell-free transcription–translation systems derived from Escherichia coli, Bacillus subtilis, Streptomyces venezuelae, mammalian cells and other organisms. These systems have been used for natural-product discovery, metabolic-pathway construction, biosensor development and the production of biological materials. Related work has included the biosynthesis of raspberry ketone and D-lysergic acid, and research on polyhydroxyalkanoate bioplastics and bacterial cellulose.

Another strand of Freemont's research concerns automated biofoundries. This work has examined high-throughput DNA construction, laboratory automation, data management, workflow interoperability and technical standards for engineering biology. During the COVID-19 pandemic, his group adapted automated biofoundry workflows for SARS-CoV-2 RNA extraction and diagnostic testing. It also developed sample-pooling methods and low-cost virus-like particles for use as molecular diagnostic controls. Freemont also contributed to studies of SARS-CoV-2 viral-load kinetics and household and community transmission.

His applied research includes whole-cell and cell-free biosensors for detecting bacterial signalling molecules and parasites, including Schistosoma species. His more recent work has examined point-of-care diagnostic systems and remote-monitoring methods for identifying urinary tract infections in people with dementia, as well as the use of synthetic biology and cell-free systems to study and engineer extracellular vesicles.

== Awards and honours ==
- 2008 – EMBO Member
- 2011 – Fellow of the Royal Society of Biology
- 2015 – Ellison–Cliffe Medal Lecture, Royal Society of Medicine
- 2019 – Fellow of the Royal Society of Chemistry
- 2019 – Honorary Fellow of the Royal College of Art

== Selected books ==
- Advances in Nuclear Architecture (co-editor, Springer, 2009)
- Synthetic Biology: A Primer (co-editor, Imperial College Press, 2012)
