= Creese =

Creese is a surname. Notable people with the surname include:

- James Creese (1896–1966), American academic administrator
- Len Creese (1907–1974), South African-born British cricketer
- Matthew Creese (born 1982), British cricketer
- Sadie Creese, British cybersecurity specialist

== See also ==
- John Kreese, fictional karate sensei
- Crease (disambiguation)
