= Trevor McMillan =

English radiobiologist, Vice-Chancellor of Keele University

Trevor McMillan OBE FRCR FRSB

Vice Chancellor of Keele University
- In office 2015–2025

Personal details
- Born: Gateshead, England, UK
- Education: Lancaster University; University of London
- Profession: University Vice Chancellor
- Website: https://www.keele.ac.uk/connect/vice-chancellorsoffice/vice-chancellor/
- Scientific career
- Education: Lancaster University; University of London
- Fields: Radiobiology
- Thesis: (1984)

Trevor John McMillan OBE FRCR FRSB (born 2 October 1959) is an English radiobiologist who was Vice-Chancellor of Keele University from 10 August 2015 to September 2025 .

== Early life ==
Born in Gateshead, McMillan was educated at Birtley Lord Lawson Comprehensive School, UK before studying Biological Sciences at Lancaster University, graduating in 1981. He was awarded a PhD in Biophysics at the Institute of Cancer Research, University of London in 1984.

== Career ==
McMillan's early research was carried out at the Institute of Cancer Research/Royal Marsden Hospital and the Imperial Cancer Research Fund. McMillan has published widely on the use of X-rays in radiotherapy and the harmful effects of long wavelength UV radiation in sunlight. In particular his research has examined the role of DNA damage and repair in the efficacy of radiotherapy and the harmful cellular effects of UVA following environmentally relevant exposures.

Before moving to Keele as Deputy Vice-Chancellor and Provost in January 2014, he was at Lancaster University where he had several roles including Dean of the Institute of Environmental and Natural Sciences, Head of the Department of Biological Sciences and finally Pro Vice-Chancellor for Research (2005–2014). During this time he chaired the Research and Enterprise Committee for the 1994 Group of Universities in which he led the publication of “Enterprising Universities - Using the Research Base to add Value to Business”. He also Chaired the Management Committee of the N8 Research Partnership.

== Professional activities ==
On the basis of his research, McMillan has worked on national committees that have examined the harmful effects of radiation in the environment. These included COMARE (Committee on Medical Aspects of Radiation in the Environment) for the Department of Health.

He is currently on the Advisory Group for Ionising Radiation for Public Health England and the Advisory Group for the National Institute for Health Research (NIHR) Health Protection Research Unit (HPRU) in Chemical and Radiation Threats and Hazards at Newcastle University. He led the production of the report Circulatory Disease Risk for the AGIR. He has recently (December 2015) been announced as the Knowledge Exchange Framework champion for Higher Education Funding Council for England (HEFCE).

== Honours and awards ==
McMillan has been awarded Honorary Fellowship of the Royal College of Radiologists and Honorary Membership of the Royal College of Physicians. He is also a Fellow of the Royal Society of Biology.

He was appointed Officer of the Order of the British Empire (OBE) in the 2022 Birthday Honours for services to higher education.

Academic offices
Preceded by Nick Foskett	Vice-Chancellor, Keele University; 2015-2025	Succeeded by Kevin Shakesheff
