= Kevin Shakesheff =

British Medical Biologist, Pro-Vice Chancellor of Open University

Kevin Shakesheff FMedSci

Vice Chancellor of Keele University
- Incumbent
- Assumed office 2025

Pro-Vice Chancellor of Open University
- In office 2021–2025

Pro-Vice Chancellor of University of Nottingham
- In office 2015–2021
- Succeeded by: Zoe Wilson

Personal details
- Born: 1969 (age 56–57)
- Website: https://about.open.ac.uk/governance-ou/executive-team/pro-vice-chancellor-res
- Scientific career
- Education: University of Nottingham
- Alma mater: University of Nottingham; Massachusetts Institute of Technology (MIT)
- Awards: RISE award (EPSRC)
- Fields: Regenerative Medicine; Biological Therapy

Kevin Shakesheff FMedSci is a British medical biologist. He is Vice-Chancellor of Keele University, and has served as Pro-Vice Chancellor for Research and Innovation at the Open University.

== Career ==
Shakesheff qualified as a Pharmacist in the early 1990s and received a PhD in Advanced Drug Delivery Systems from the University of Nottingham School of Pharmacy. He completed a postdoctoral fellowship at MIT In 1997 Shakesheff returned to the University of Nottingham as an EPSRC Advanced Fellow. He became a Professor in 2002, and in 2015 became the first Pro-Vice Chancellor for Science there. In 2019 he was elected to the Chair of OneNottingham.

Shakesheff became the Pro-Vice-Chancellor for Research and Innovation at the Open University in 2021, and in September 2025 became Vice Chancellor of Keele University.

He was elected a Fellow of the Academy of Medical Sciences in 2024.
