= Nick Foskett =

Nicholas Hedley Foskett (born 12 March 1955) was formerly Vice-Chancellor at Keele University in Staffordshire (August 2010 – August 2015), a Professor of Education at the University of Southampton and Dean of the Faculty of Law, Arts and Social Sciences.

== Biography ==
Born in Burslem, Stoke-on-Trent, Foskett was educated at Wolstanton Grammar School in Milehouse Lane, Newcastle-under-Lyme (now The Orme Academy). He read Geography at Keble College, Oxford before becoming a secondary school geography teacher. He was appointed senior academic administrator at Aston University in 1987, two years later he moved on to the University of Southampton as a lecturer in education, where he became a professor in 2000. In August 2010 he became Vice-Chancellor of Keele University. He is also a Trustee of Regent's University London.

== Academic work ==
His particular areas of interest and expertise lie in the field of educational policy and management, with a particular focus on education 14-19 and higher education. Foskett also retains a strong interest in environmental issues and environmental education from his background in geography teaching, and continues to publish on aspects of the role of fieldwork and outdoor education in schools and colleges. His latest books are on educational management (Sage) and young people’s decision-making in education (Routledge Falmer) (see bibliography).

== Personal life ==
He is married with two children.

== Bibliography ==
- Choosing Futures: Young people's decision-making in education, training and careers markets (2001), with Jane Hemsley-Brown, Routledge Falmer
- Leading and Managing Education: The International Dimensions (2003), with Jacky Lumby, Paul Chapman Publishing/Sage Publications
- Leading and managing education: international dimensions (2003), with Jacky Lumby, Sage Publications
- 14-19 Education: Policy, Leadership and Learning (2005), with Jacky Lumby, Sage Publications
- Postgraduate study in the UK: the international student's guide (2006), with Rosalind Foskett, Sage Publications

Academic offices
Preceded by Professor Dame Janet Finch	Vice-Chancellor, Keele University; 2010-2015	Succeeded by Professor Trevor McMillan
Preceded by Professor Christina Slade	Interim Vice-Chancellor, Bath Spa University; 2017-2018	Succeeded by Professor Sue Rigby
