= Keele University =

Public university in Keele, England

University of Keele
- Coat of arms
- Motto: Thanke God for All
- Type: Public research university
- Established: Founded in 1949 as the University College of North Staffordshire, receiving its royal charter as the University of Keele in 1962
- Academic affiliations: ACU; EUA; Universities UK; Midlands Innovation
- Endowment: £2.8m surplus (2024/25)
- Budget: £213.3m total income (2024/25)
- Chancellor: Carol Shanahan
- Vice-Chancellor: Kevin Shakesheff
- Visitor: The Lord President of the Council (ex officio)
- Faculty: 945 (2024/25)
- Administrative staff: 1199 (2025/26)
- Students: 13680 (2024/25)
- Undergraduates: 9990 (2024/25)
- Postgraduates: 3695 (2024/25)
- Location: Keele, Newcastle-under-Lyme, Staffordshire, UK; 53.003°N 2.273°W
- Campus: 625; Rural
- Newspaper: Concourse
Colours
Staffordshire gold and red
- Sporting affiliations: Team Keele
- Mascot: Herbert the Dragon
- Website: keele.ac.uk

Keele University is a public research university in Keele, Staffordshire, England. Originally established in 1949 as the University College of North Staffordshire, it received university status through a Royal Charter in 1962, becoming the University of Keele. The university pioneered the UK's dual honours degree system, offering students the chance to study two subjects together. It celebrated its 75th anniversary in 2024.

Keele University is among the UK's largest campus universities, occupying 625-acre (253-hectare) of landscaped grounds that include woodlands, lakes, and the Grade II* listed Keele Hall. It also has one of the largest collections of flowering cherry trees in Europe, for which it received an award from the Japanese Ambassador to the UK.

Situated on the university campus, the Keele University Science and Innovation Park is home to more than 60 companies and approximately 1,000 employees, from start-ups to global multinationals including Michelin.

With three faculties and 12 schools, Keele offers undergraduate and postgraduate courses to a student population of more than 15,000. It achieved the highest rating of Gold in the Teaching Excellence Framework 2017 and 2023, and is of a handful of universities in the UK to have both medical and veterinary schools.

In September 2025, Keele officially opened a new European campus in Athens, Greece, after becoming one of the first four foreign universities authorised to establish a University Legal Entity in Greece under new legislation, in partnership with the local private education provider, Metropolitan College.

The university has more than 100,000 alumni spread across 162 countries in the world. Notable former students include Namibian President Netumbo Nandi-Ndaitwah, former Home Secretary Dame Priti Patel MBE, barrister Michael Mansfield KC and British television presenter AJ Odudu.

== History ==
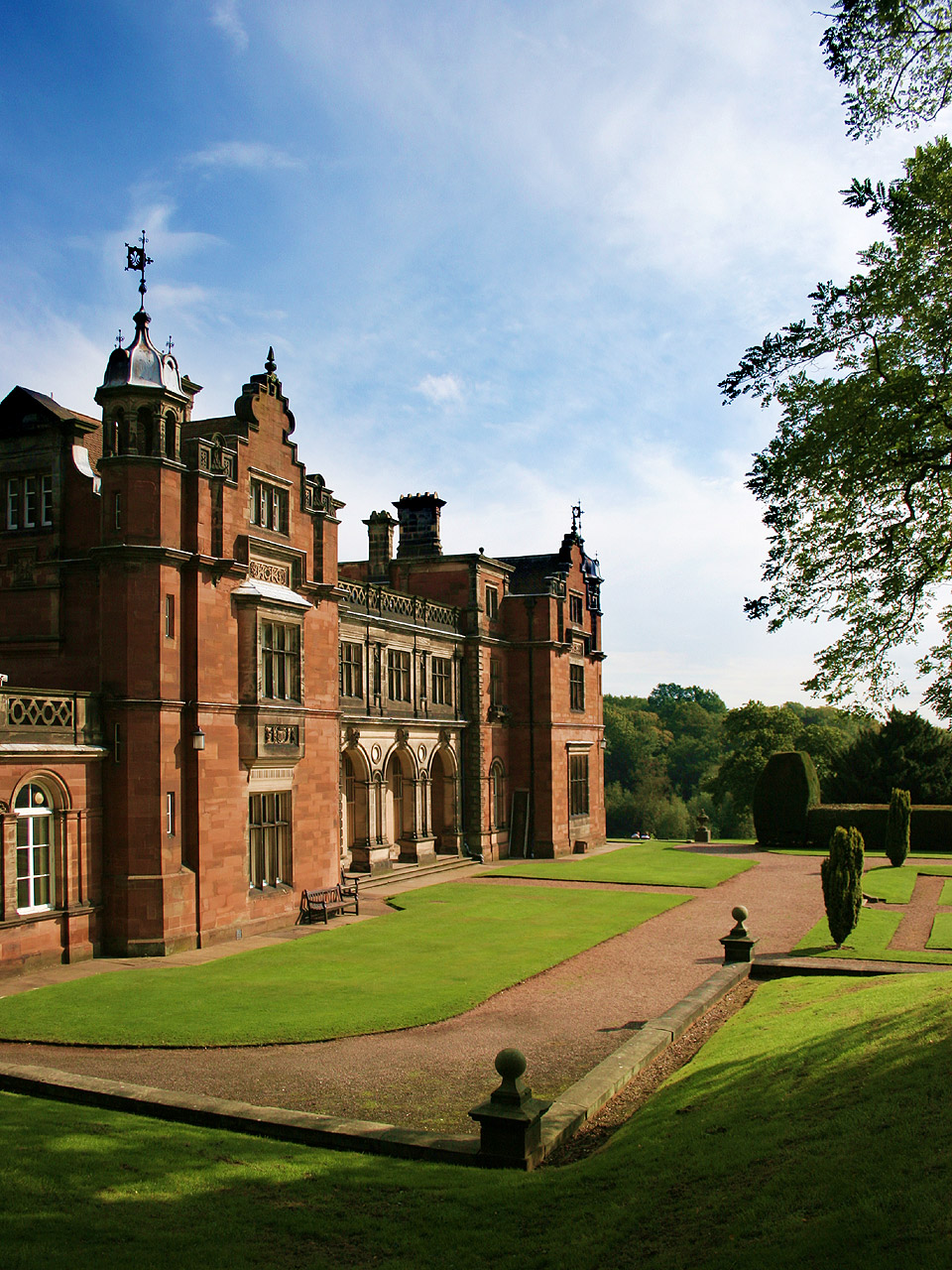
Grade II* listed Keele Hall, situated on the university's campus.

=== Establishment ===
Cambridge and Oxford extension lectures had been arranged in the Potteries since the 1890s, but outside any organised educational framework or establishment. In 1904, funds were raised by local industrialists to support teaching by the creation of a North Staffordshire College, but the project, without the backing of Staffordshire County Council, was abandoned.

By the late 1930s, the Staffordshire towns of Longton, Fenton, Burslem, Hanley had grown into the largest conurbation in the UK without some form of university provision. A large area including Staffordshire, Shropshire and parts of Cheshire and Derbyshire did not have its own university. Stoke, in particular, demanded highly qualified graduates for the regional pottery and mining industries and also additional social workers, teachers and administrators.

A. D. Lindsay, Professor of Philosophy and Master of Balliol College, Oxford, was a strong advocate of working-class adult education, and suggested a "people's university" in an address to the North Staffordshire Workers' Educational Association in 1925.

==== Curricular philosophy ====
Recently appointed to the House of Lords, Lindsay participated in producing the influential Foreign Office report University Reform in Germany, which argued that no institution deserved the name of "university" unless it combined teaching and research. Consistent with his democratic ideals of education, Lindsay also warned of the dangers of training the specialist intellect in the natural sciences and the need to introduce elements of social sciences at university level by broadening the academic agenda. Lindsay believed technological excesses sponsored by the state without a review of the social and political consequences had been a major contributor to Germany's downfall. This was to heavily influence Keele's curriculum.

University of Keele Act 1962
- Act of Parliament
- Parliament of the United Kingdom
- Long title: An Act to dissolve the University College of North Staffordshire and to transfer all the property and liabilities of that college to the University of Keele; and for other purposes.
- Citation: 10 & 11 Eliz. 2. c. xv

Dates
- Royal assent: 24 May 1962

Status: Current legislation

Text of the University of Keele Act 1962 as in force today (including any amendments) within the United Kingdom, from legislation.gov.uk.

On 13 March 1946, Lindsay wrote to Sir Walter Moberly, chair of the University Grants Committee (UGC), suggesting the creation of a college "on new lines". The committee wanted a university for the 20th century that could overcome the division between arts and sciences, and what Moberly was calling the "evil of departmentalism". The UGC argued that "The tasks of the modern citizen and the study of modern society should be central to the curriculum." North Staffordshire was seen as an ideal site since it "presented many typical problems thrown up by modern industrial conglomerations, such as those posed by technical innovation in the pottery and mining industries." The college could become a "social laboratory" for industries and the local communities they catered for.

Normal practice was for new colleges (such as Southampton, Exeter and Nottingham) to be launched without degree-awarding powers. Students would instead matriculate with and take external degrees from the University of London. Lindsay wanted to "get rid of the London external degree" and instead found a college with degree-awarding authority, as well as the power to set its own syllabus, perhaps acting under the sponsorship of an established university. This would allow the college to start afresh in the setting of its curriculum. Lindsay wrote to the Vice-Chancellor of the University of Oxford, tentatively requesting such sponsorship.

An exploratory committee was established by Stoke-on-Trent City Council, and, having secured public funding from the UGC in January 1948, the committee acquired Keele Hall on the outskirts of Newcastle-under-Lyme from its owner, Ralph Sneyd. The Hall was purchased together with the bulk of the Sneyd estate and a number of prefabricated structures erected by the Army during the Second World War for £31,000 in order for it to become the home of the newly-created University College of North Staffordshire, with Lindsay as its Founding Principal.

In August 1949 the university college was granted the right to award its own degrees. The first graduate was George Eason, who had studied mathematics at Birmingham University and gained a BSc in 1951. He received his MSc in 1952 from Keele. In 1954 the first graduate studying fully at Keele was Margaret Boulds, who received a dual honours degree in philosophy and English.

==== Receiving university status ====
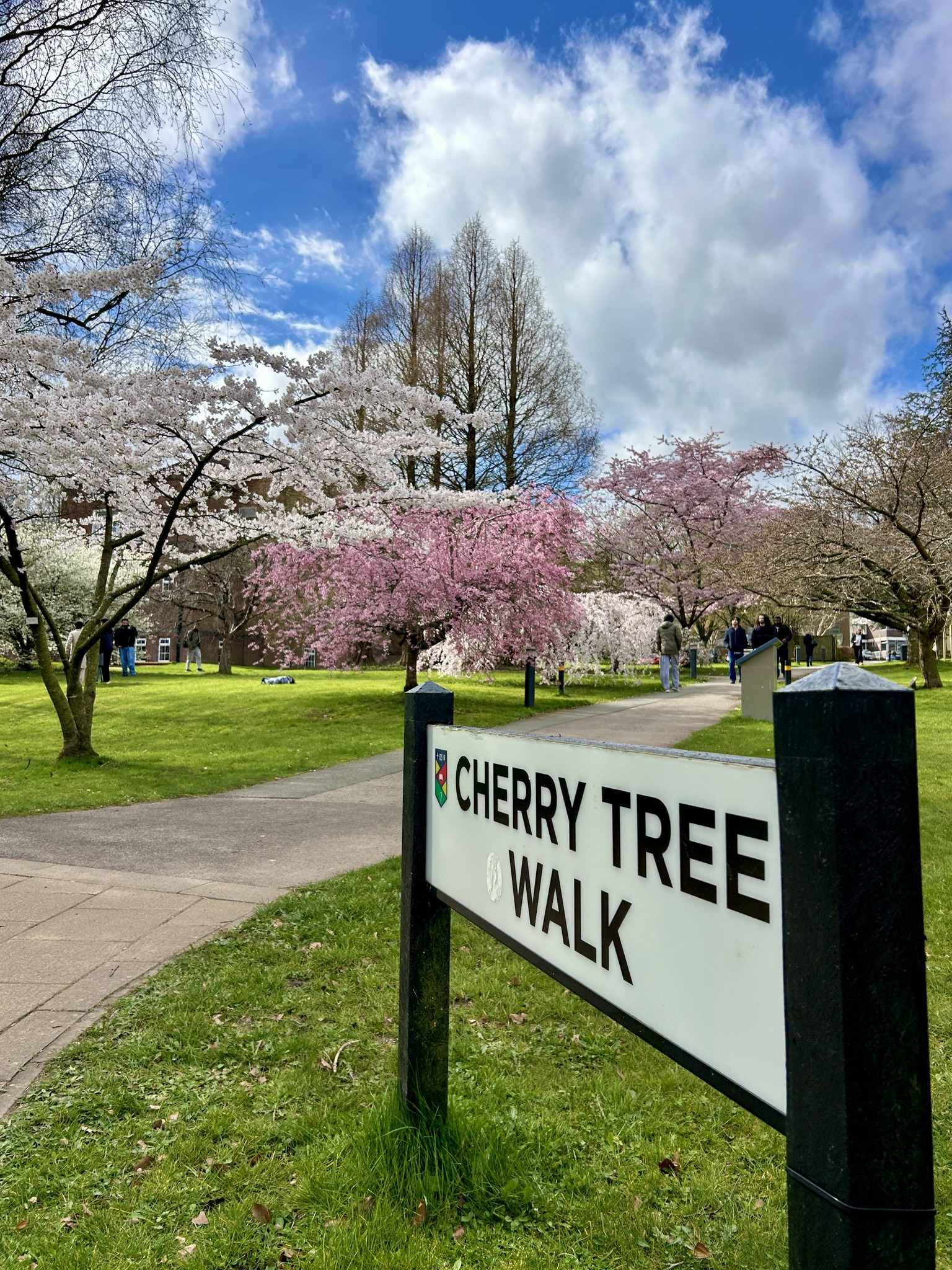
Keele University - Cherry Tree Walk

Growing steadily to 1,200 students, the university college was granted university status in 1962, receiving a new royal charter in January that year, and adopting the name "University of Keele". Alternatives were considered, including "The University of Stoke" or "Stoke-on-Trent", but both were rejected because the estate is situated in the borough of Newcastle-under-Lyme. The university is a short distance west of the civil parish of Keele, and it was decided to name it after the village. It is the only establishment of higher education in the UK to be named after a village, and this has long attracted questions as to its location. Together with Reading, Nottingham, Southampton, Hull, Exeter and Leicester, all university colleges founded a short time before or after the First World War, Keele was identified as one of the "younger civic universities" by the Robbins Report.

In 1968 the Royal Commission on Medical Education (1965–68) issued the Todd Report, which examined the possibility of a medical school being established at Keele. It was considered that North Staffordshire would be a good site, having a large local population and several hospitals. However, a minimum intake of 150 students each year would be necessary to make a medical school economically and educationally viable, and the university was at that time too small to support a medical school of this size.

By 1969, Keele University was being described as "the most original innovation in British university education in the 20th century". HRH The Princess Margaret, Countess of Snowdon, was the university's Chancellor from 1962 to 1986 – still the longest serving in its history.

Keele's International Relations Department was founded in 1974 by Alan James and was one of the first institutions to offer a full degree in the subject. The Keele World Affairs Group, closely associated, followed suit in 1980. Keele's first female professor was appointed to the Chair of Social Work in 1976. In 1978, Keele Department of Postgraduate Medicine was created, although it did not cater for undergraduate medical students.

=== The 1980s and 90s ===
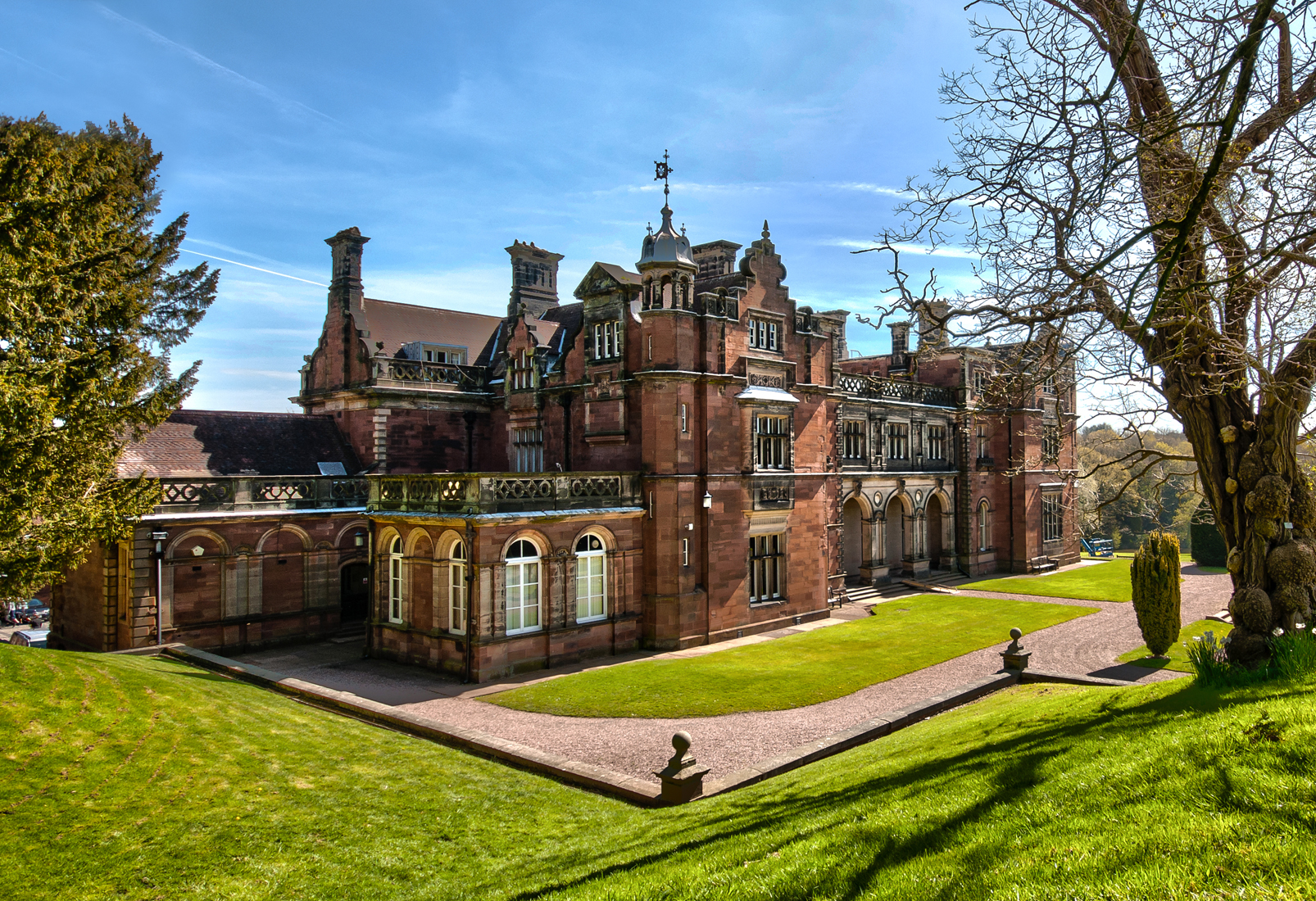
Keele Hall, Keele University

In late 1985, after a series of cuts in university funding, Keele briefly considered merging with North Staffordshire Polytechnic, but negotiations collapsed. In September 1983, the Secretary of State, via the UGC, had encouraged the idea, asserting that the most radical way of increasing the size of departments and diminishing their number is by the merger of institutions. At the time, Keele had a population of 2,700 students, compared to 6,000 at the less academically exclusive Polytechnic. Edwina Currie, then Conservative MP for South Derbyshire, remarked, "A university which is now below 3,000 students has got problems. It simply isn't big enough". Keele University Science & Business Park Ltd (KUSP Ltd) opened in 1987, partly to generate and diversify alternative sources of income.

In 1994, the Oswestry and North Staffordshire School of Physiotherapy (ONSSP), which had been a separate institution based at the Robert Jones and Agnes Hunt Orthopaedic Hospital in Oswestry, Shropshire, merged with Keele University, becoming Keele's Department of Physiotherapy Studies. It moved to the Keele University campus. In August 1995, Keele University merged with North Staffordshire College of Nursing and Midwifery, forming the new School of Nursing and Midwifery. In 1998 and 1999 there was some controversy when the university decided to sell the Turner Collection, a valuable collection of printed mathematical books, including some which had belonged to and had been heavily annotated by Isaac Newton, in order to fund major improvements to the university library. Senior university officials authorised the sale of the collection to a private buyer, with no guarantee that it would remain intact or within the UK. Although the sale was legal, it was unpopular among the academic community, and the controversy was fuelled by prolonged negative press coverage suggesting that the £1m sale price was too low and that the collection was certain to be broken up. The university had earlier withdrawn the honorary degree it awarded in 1980 to former UN Secretary-General Kurt Waldheim.

=== 21st century developments ===
==== New Schools of Medicine, Pharmacy, Nursing and Midwifery ====
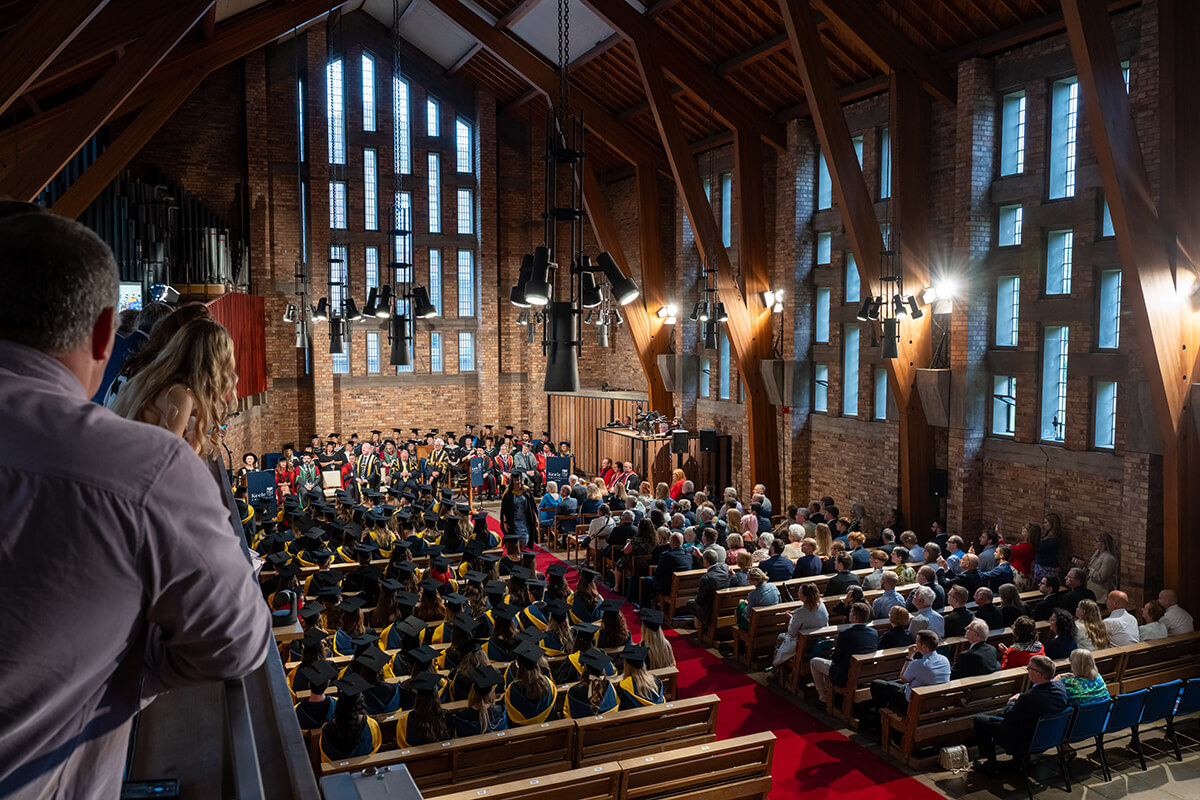
Graduation in Keele Chapel

Sir David Weatherall was named as Chancellor in 2000. In 2001, Keele was awarded an undergraduate medical school in partnership with Manchester University. Initially, some students from Manchester Medical School began being taught at Keele. Finally Keele's own medical school opened in 2007 with the first of cohort of students graduating in 2012. In 2024, Mohamed Jalloh (Medicine MBChB) became the 2,024^{th} medicine professional to qualify through one of the university's medicine degrees since it began teaching clinical undergraduate medicine. The School of Medicine consistently ranks highly in UK league tables, placing 5^{th} for Medicine in England in the 2026 Guardian University Guide.

In 2009, the university was awarded a Queen's Anniversary Prize for Higher and Further Education, for 'pioneering work with the NHS in early intervention and primary care in the treatment of chronic pain and arthritis, linking research to delivery to patients through GP networks and user groups'. In 2006 the School of Pharmacy was created with the launch of MPharm degree programmes.

In early 2001, to cut costs, the faculties of Humanities and Social Sciences merged. Due to declining popularity and funding, the German department closed in December 2004 with the university retaining its physics degree despite the subject facing similar pressures. Although degrees ceased to be offered in modern languages, a Language Learning Unit was created to provide Arabic, Mandarin Chinese, French, German, Japanese, Russian and Spanish teaching for Keele students and staff. This can lead to an enhanced degree title given sufficient electives taken.

The foundation year was eliminated in 1998 but re-introduced in 2012 with new programmes of study, the international foundation year and the accelerated international foundation year which add to the existing offer, as well as the humanities, science, social science, health, general foundation years and foundation year for people who are visually impaired.

==== Environmental agenda and energy projects ====
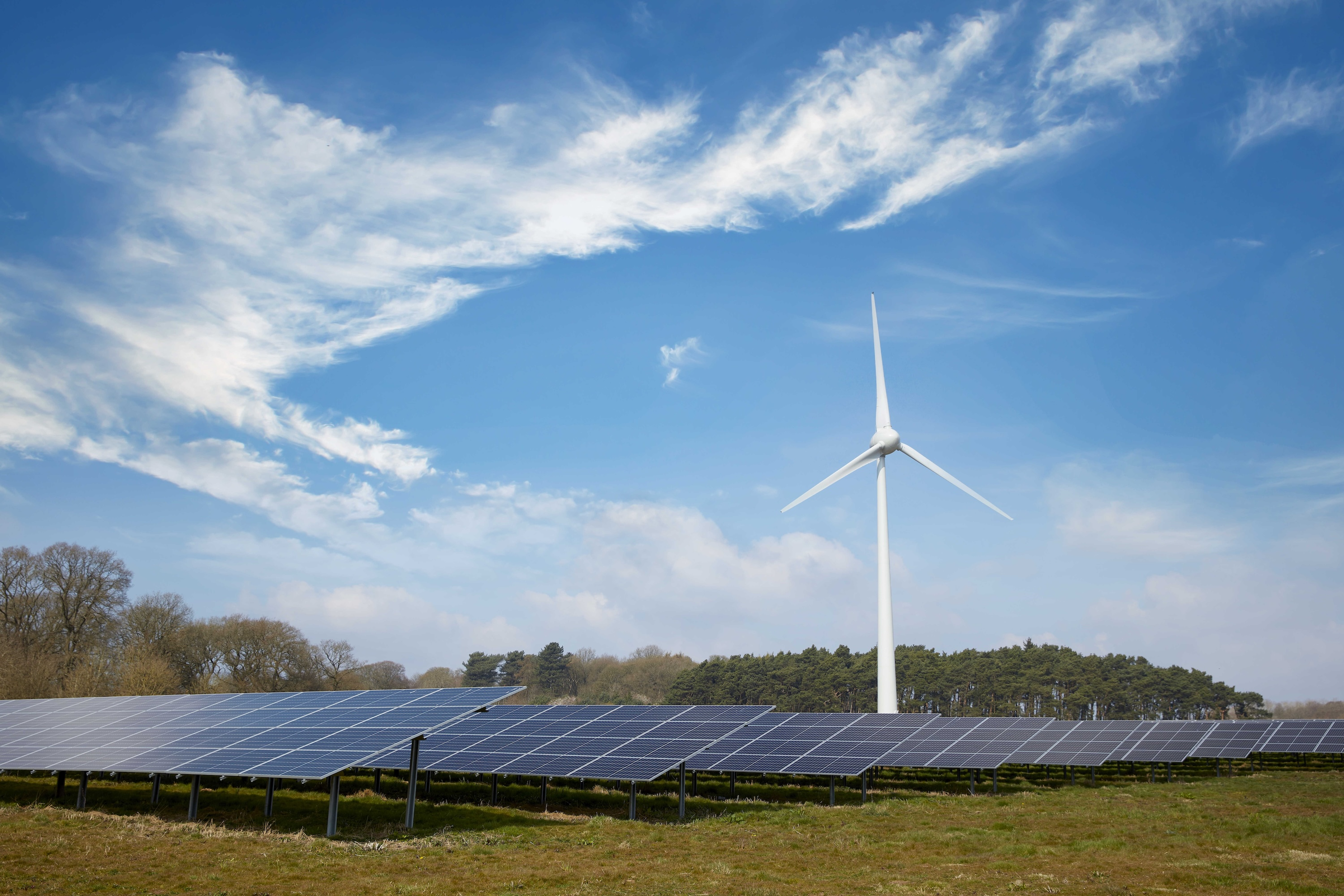
Keele University Low Carbon Energy Generation Park

The university has a globally recognised sustainability reputation, consistently ranking highly in international league tables for its research, education, and campus operations, earning titles like Global Sustainability Institution of the Year.

Starting in 2012, Keele has placed environmental sustainability at the heart of its strategy. It was named Global Sustainability Institution of the Year in the Green Gown Awards (2021).

The university's low carbon energy generation park, featuring two wind turbines and 12,500 solar panels, as well as an industrial-sized battery to store the generated energy, generates up to 50% of the university's campus electricity requirements from renewable sources, saving around 1,500 tonnes of carbon emissions each year.

A UK-first trial to blend hydrogen into the gas network in a bid to reduce carbon emissions was completed successfully at Keele in 2021. HyDeploy began in October 2019 and was the first trial of its kind in the country which saw hydrogen blended with the campus' closed gas network at up to 20% by volume.

Between 2017-19, Keele's campus was transformed into Europe's first smart energy test site to develop pioneering green technologies and help cut the UK's carbon emissions. The £22 million programme, called the Smart Energy Network Demonstrator (SEND), was developed in collaboration with Siemens, which turned Keele's campus into a 'living laboratory'.

==== Business School relocation ====
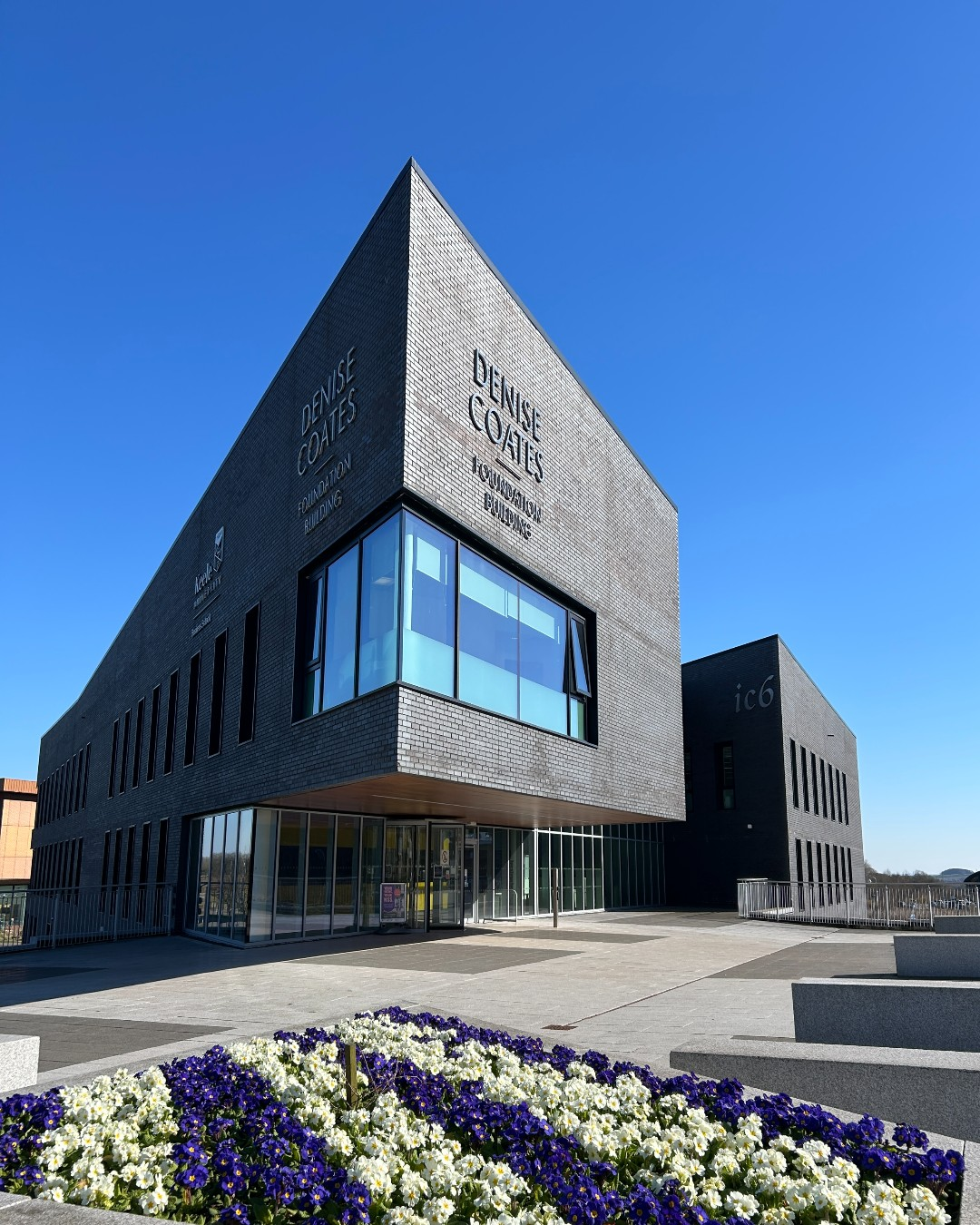
Denise Coates Foundation Building

Keele University's new, state-of-the-art business school, housed in the Denise Coates Foundation Building, officially opened in January 2020, creating a collaborative hub with a Smart Innovation Hub and workspace for students, academics, and local businesses, fostering innovation and real-world engagement in a landmark facility on the campus entrance. It was opened by Denise Coates CBE, one of the world's most successful business leaders, and Nataliey Bitature, an entrepreneur and Keele Business School alumna who was named as one of Forbes Africa's 30 under 30 in 2018.

==== Veterinary School ====
Harper and Keele Veterinary School opened in 2020 as a joint venture with Harper Adams University. It offers a five-year BVetMS degree. A new building offering teaching facilities, clinics and staff and student facilities on campus opened in October 2021. In July 2025, the School's pioneer cohort of 90 newly qualified vets graduated. In the same month, the School was also ranked No.1 in the UK for Veterinary Medicine in the National Student Survey 2025. The School received full accreditation from the Royal College of Veterinary Surgeons (RCVS) Council for its Veterinary Medicine and Surgery (BVetMS) degree in October 2025.

=== Symbols ===
==== Heraldry ====
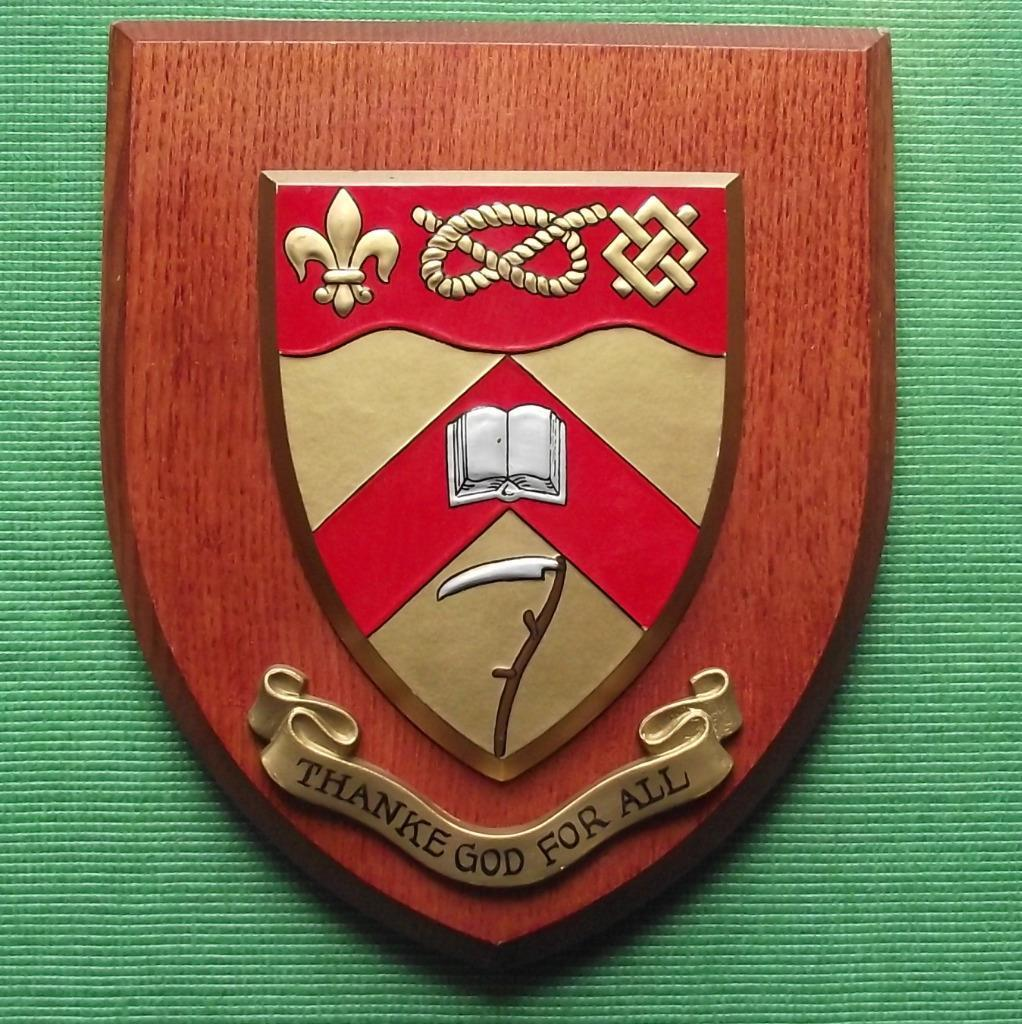
University Shield

The heraldic grant of arms features the scythe of the Sneyd family, who owned the Keele park estate from 1540 to 1949, and includes the Sneyd family's motto "Thanke God for All". The shield features the colours red and yellow to represent the County of Staffordshire as well as the Staffordshire chevron. The Stafford knot for Stafford, the Fleur-de-Lys for Burton upon Trent and the Fret depict the historical association with the industry of Stoke-on-Trent. An open book joins Rodin's Le Penseur, which is represented amid a wreath of laurel vert. Variations on this have appeared in various corporate logos and shield but this remains the formal grant of arms in official documents.

==== Corporate logo ====
Prior to 1986, the university shield was principally utilized on marketing (e.g. university prospectus) and communications material (corporate letterheads etc.). With the opening of the Science park, brand identity evolved with a new, modern corporate word marque featuring 'Congress' and 'Proteus' typefaces. In 1995, the corporate logo changed again with an intertwined ribbon motif representing the overlapping of educational disciplines. In 2011, the university shield returned relying heavily on the armorial bearings but with a modern twist for the digital age.

==== Academic dress ====
The academic gowns reflect the colours of the County of Staffordshire and emphasise red and yellow. Higher Doctorates utilise purple, whilst the College of Fellows uses red and gold.

== Campus ==
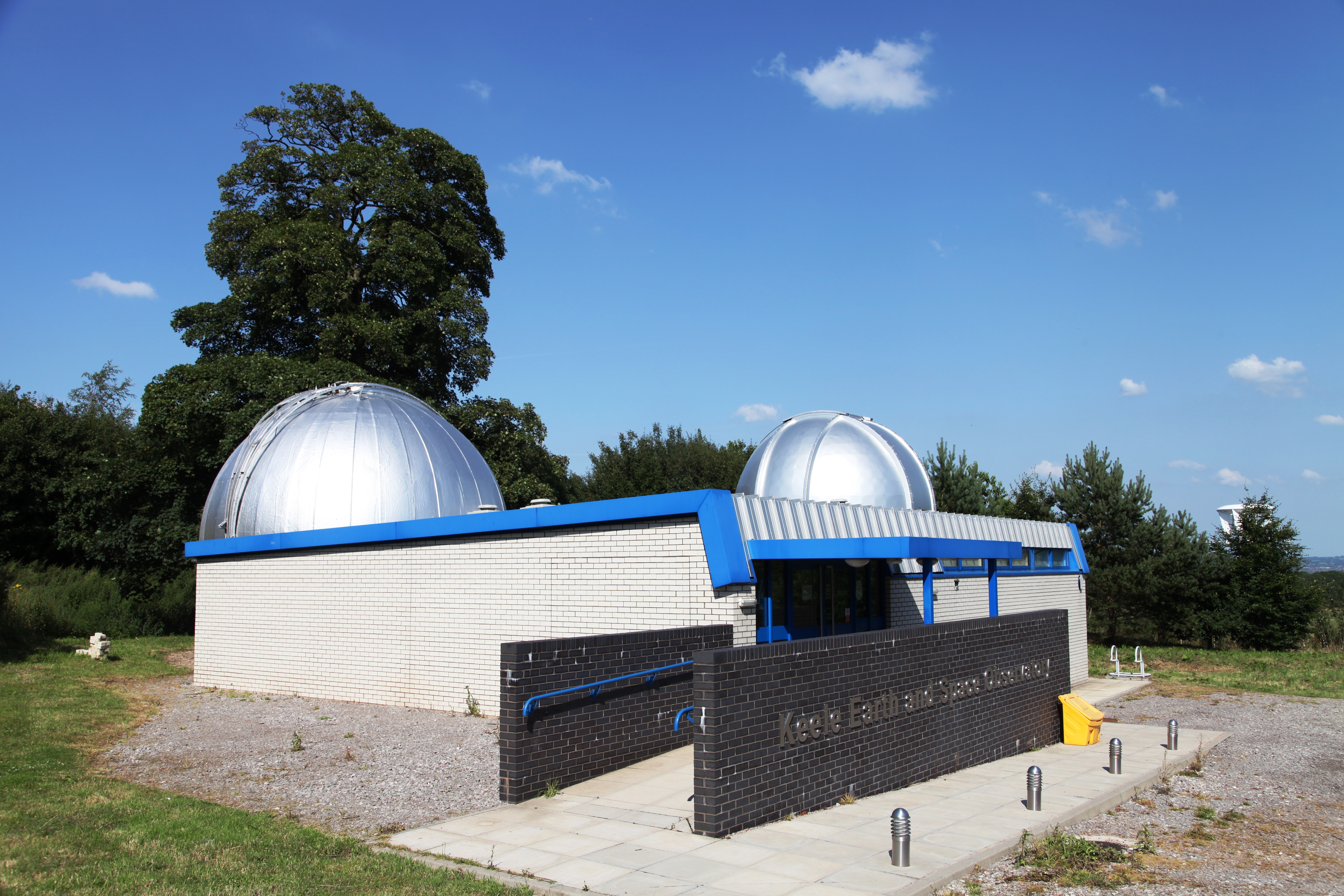
Keele Observatory

The campus occupies a 600-acre (240-hectare) rural setting close to the village of Keele, in North Staffordshire, making it one the biggest in the UK. The estate was originally given by King Henry II of England to the Knights Templars in 1180. When the Templars were condemned and dissolved by the Council of Vienne in 1311, their possessions were annexed by the Knights Hospitallers until their dissolution by Henry VIII. The estate was purchased from the Crown by the Sneyd family and remained their property until acquisition by the Stoke-on-Trent Corporation in 1948.

Along with academic and residential buildings, other facilities include an astronomical observatory, Marriott hotel, indoor and outdoor sport facilities, a Students' Union, arts and cultural programmes, arboretum, library, chapel, Islamic centre, shops, cafés and places to eat and drink.

Situated on the university campus, the Keele University Science and Innovation Park is home to more than 60 companies and approximately 1,000 employees, from innovative start-ups to global multinationals including Michelin. In 2025, the university announced plans to expand the park with the creation of an Innovation District that could create up to 5,400 jobs.

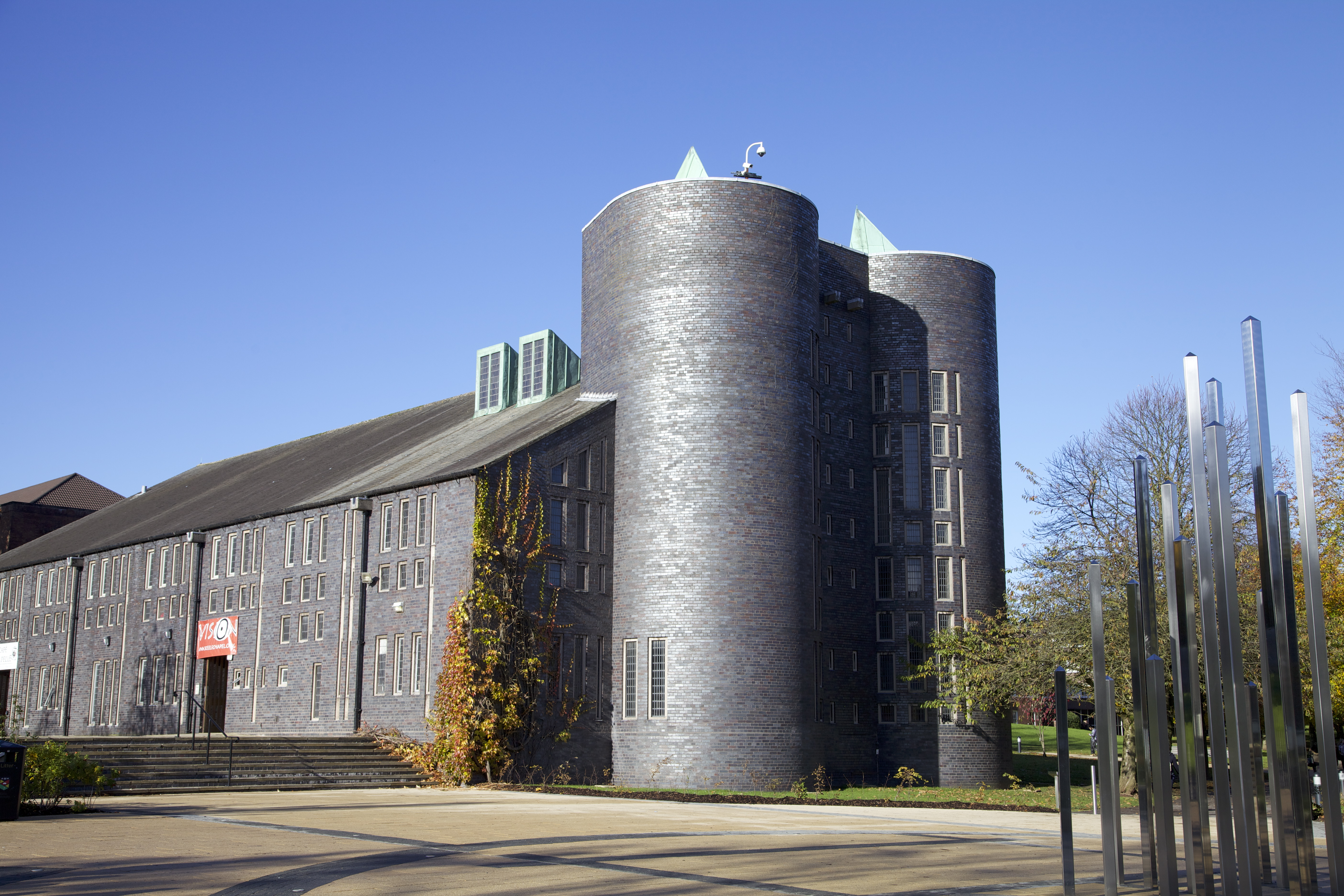
Keele Chapel

Located in the heart of the campus, Keele University Chapel is open to students, staff and the public. In 2025, the chapel celebrated 60 years since it was officially dedicated in a ceremony attended by Her Majesty Queen Elizabeth The Queen Mother, and Princess Margaret, Keele's Chancellor at the time.

The chapel was the first religious building in the country designed specifically for shared Christian worship, marking a landmark step toward greater unity among denominations. Before its construction, services were held in a temporary hut, though Keele's Founding Principal, Lord Lindsay, had always envisioned a permanent, multi-denominational chapel at the heart of campus.

Today, Keele Chapel remains a Local Ecumenical Partnership (L.E.P.), representing five major Christian denominations - Anglican, Catholic, Methodist, Baptist, and United Reformed. It holds two services on Sundays, and the university has a full-time Chaplaincy team, including a Muslim Chaplain, who serve staff and students of all faiths and none.

Alongside being the venue for graduation ceremonies and musical concerts, the chapel hosts multi-faith events such as the Langar and Grand Iftar, and serves as a space for worship, reflection, and community. It holds a small number of baptisms, weddings, and funerals each year.

=== Halls of residence ===
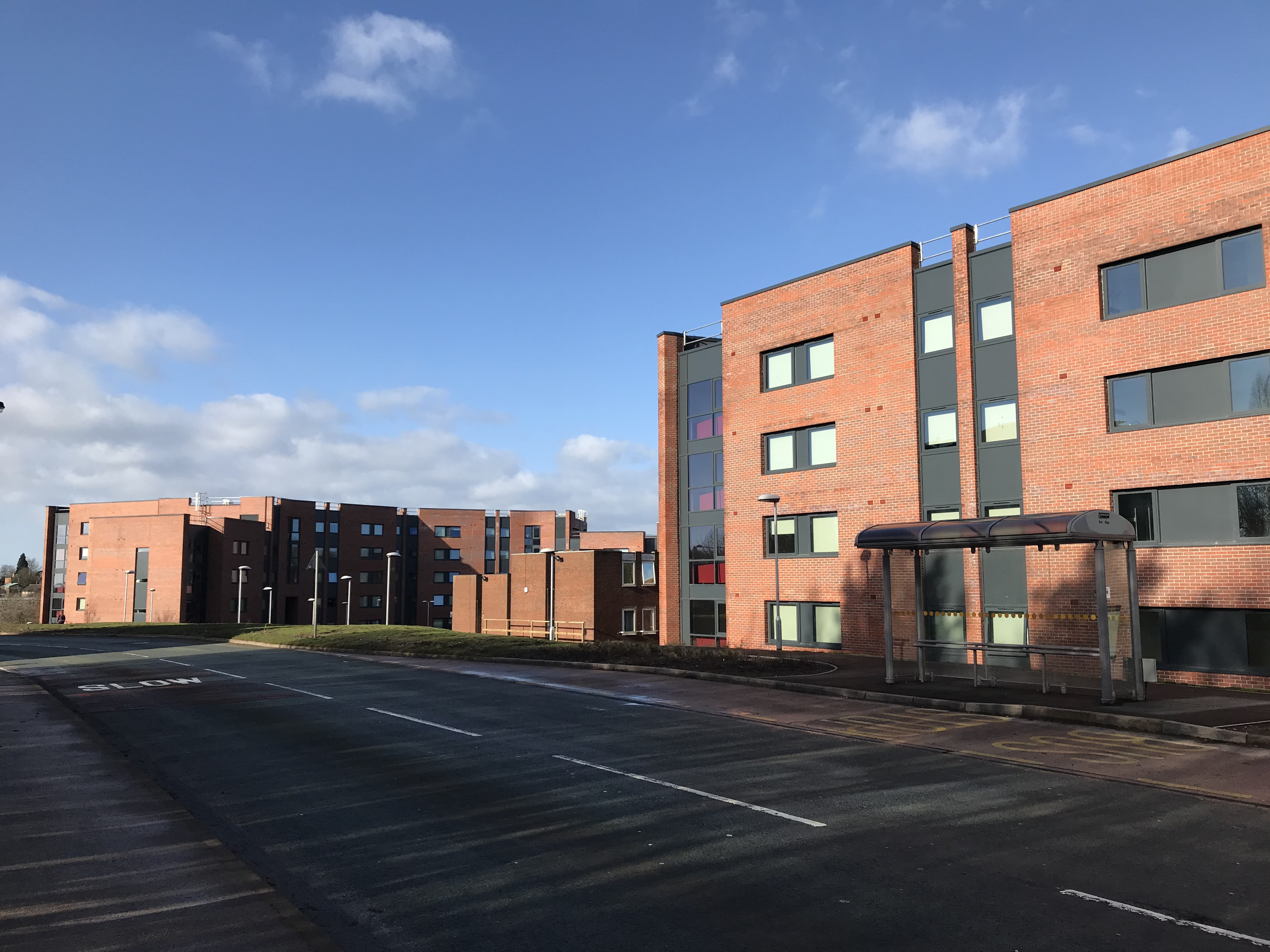
New Barnes Hall Student Units

There are five halls of residence on the main campus: Horwood, Lindsay, Barnes, Holly Cross and The Oaks. (Hawthorns Hall was located off site in Keele village just outside the main entrance. However, the site was sold for redevelopment, and the halls demolished.) These halls provide accommodation for 70% of all full-time students. Three of the oldest halls, Horwood (1957), Lindsay (1964) and Barnes (1970) are named after the founding fathers of the university. The Oaks (1992), west of Lindsay Hall, is named after four oak trees that were felled to pave the way for the university residence and Holly Cross (1993). The Hawthorns (1957), remnants of the Sneyd property in Keele Village, was originally a large house, two paddocks and gardens totalling 13 acres.

Following student demand for accommodation on-campus, work started in 2016 to build two new accommodation blocks at Barnes halls of residence, providing 453 en-suite rooms across two blocks, funded from the proceeds of the sale of the Hawthorns.

=== Library ===
Keele University Library
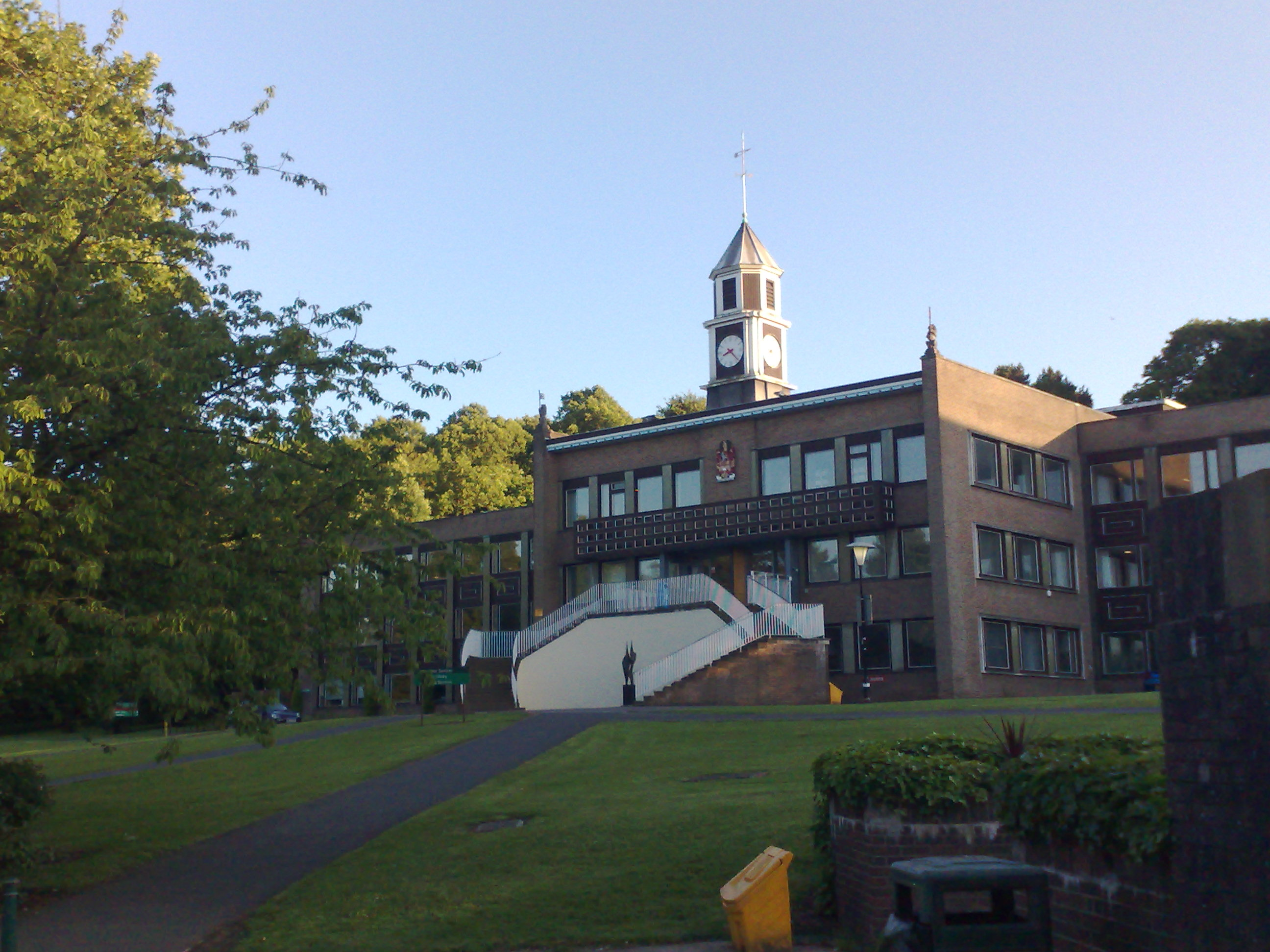
- Location: Keele University, Newcastle Under Lyme, United Kingdom
- Type: Academic library
- Established: 1962

Collection
- Items collected: books, journals, newspapers, magazines, maps, prints, drawings and manuscripts
- Size: 590,000 volumes 300,000 ebooks
- Legal deposit: Included in the Legal Deposit Libraries Act 2003

Access and use
- Members: Students and staff of Keele University

Other information
- Director: Dan Perry
- Website: www.keele.ac.uk/library

When the university was founded in 1948, the Librarian's office was located above a public house in Stoke, near the Town Hall. In 1952, the old Sneyd Library was used with 20,000 items which increased to 70,000 by 1954. By 1955, 155,000 volumes were accounted for and necessitating 12 full-time staff. Later, the Senate Room in Keele Hall was used to house the material. Construction of the new library campus began in 1961 with additional expansion completed in 1966. By the early 1970s, the library was able to accommodate 750 readers and 600,000 books.

==== Material acquisition ====
The university purchased the collection of deceased Belgian Professor Charles Saroléa, consisting of between 150,000 and 300,000 items. A viewing was organized and an agreement reached with the trustees to the acquisition of 120,000 books at a cost of £1348. However, the books were stocked in Edinburgh and removing the items without delay was one of the conditions of the agreement. A price per ton was fixed and the books arrived, first in a Methodist church school where each item was sorted and cataloged. The books were transferred to the new campus building in 1961.

==== Later developments ====
The library catalogue and circulation system was automated in 1990. In 1993, the Computer Centre merged with the library, renamed Keele Information Services (KIS). The library allowed for new PC labs and an IT Helpdesk to assist students. With further modernisation in 2006, a self-service digitised counter was opened and refurbishment of different library wings. In 2005, following students' requests, a group study area was incorporated in the Short-Loan library. The library is now opened 24/7 during each semester.

==== Health Library ====
Since the founding of the Keele University School of Medicine, a Health Library is available to both Keele students and National Health Service (NHS) staff at the Royal Stoke University Hospital. An IT suite complements the material with 60 workstations.

== Organisation and administration ==
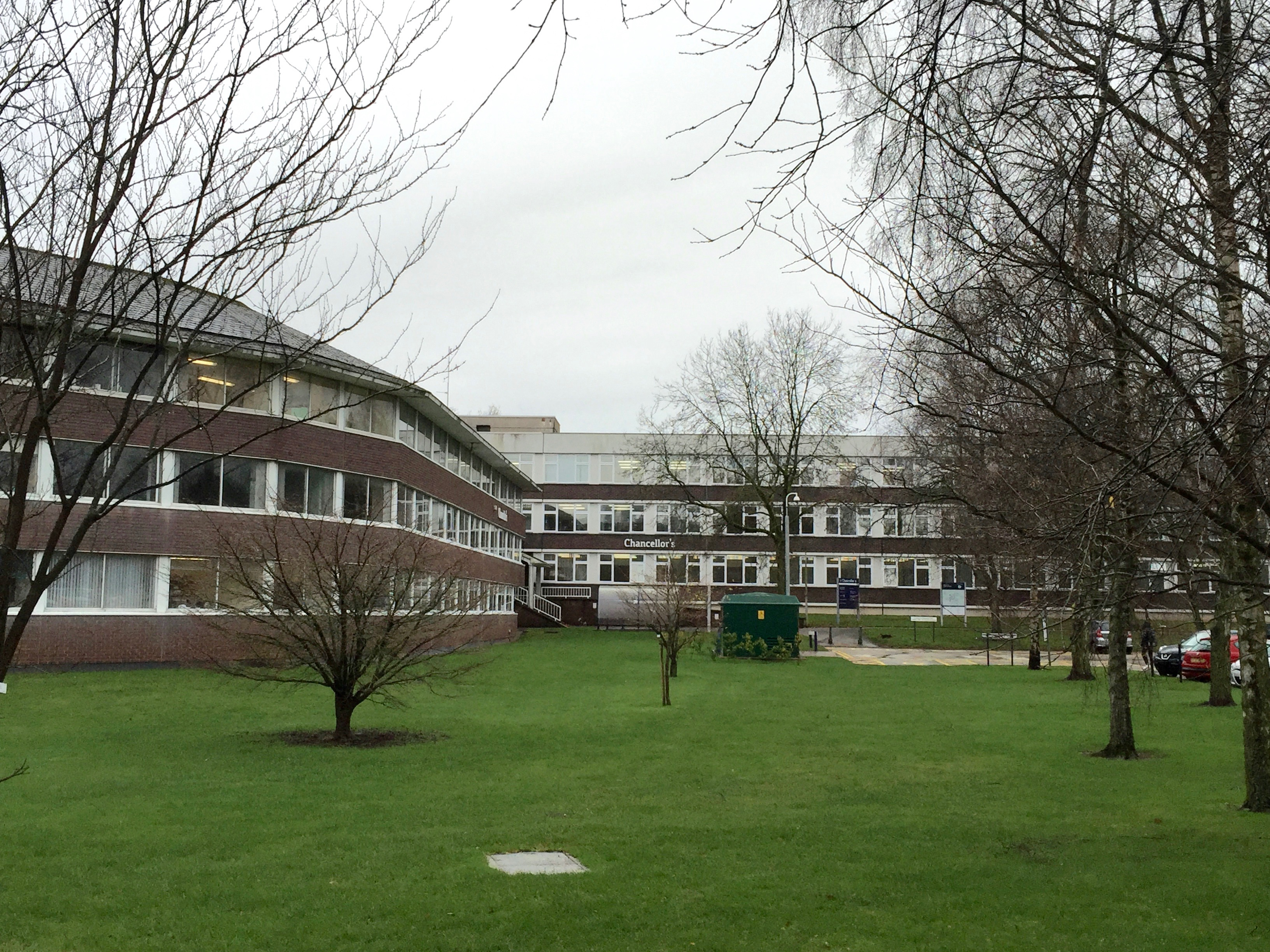
Keele University Chancellor's Building

=== Liberal arts college ethos ===
The university's curriculum required every student to study two principal subjects to honours level, as well as further subsidiary subjects, with an additional requirement that students should study at least one subject from each of the subject groupings of Arts, Sciences and Social Sciences. The cross-disciplinary requirement was reinforced by the Foundation Year, an innovation which meant that for the first year of the four-year programmes, all students would study a common course of interdisciplinary "foundation studies". This key particularity of the Keele curriculum led Michael Brawne to remark in 1966 that the university was "the nearest thing in Britain to the small liberal arts college in the US".

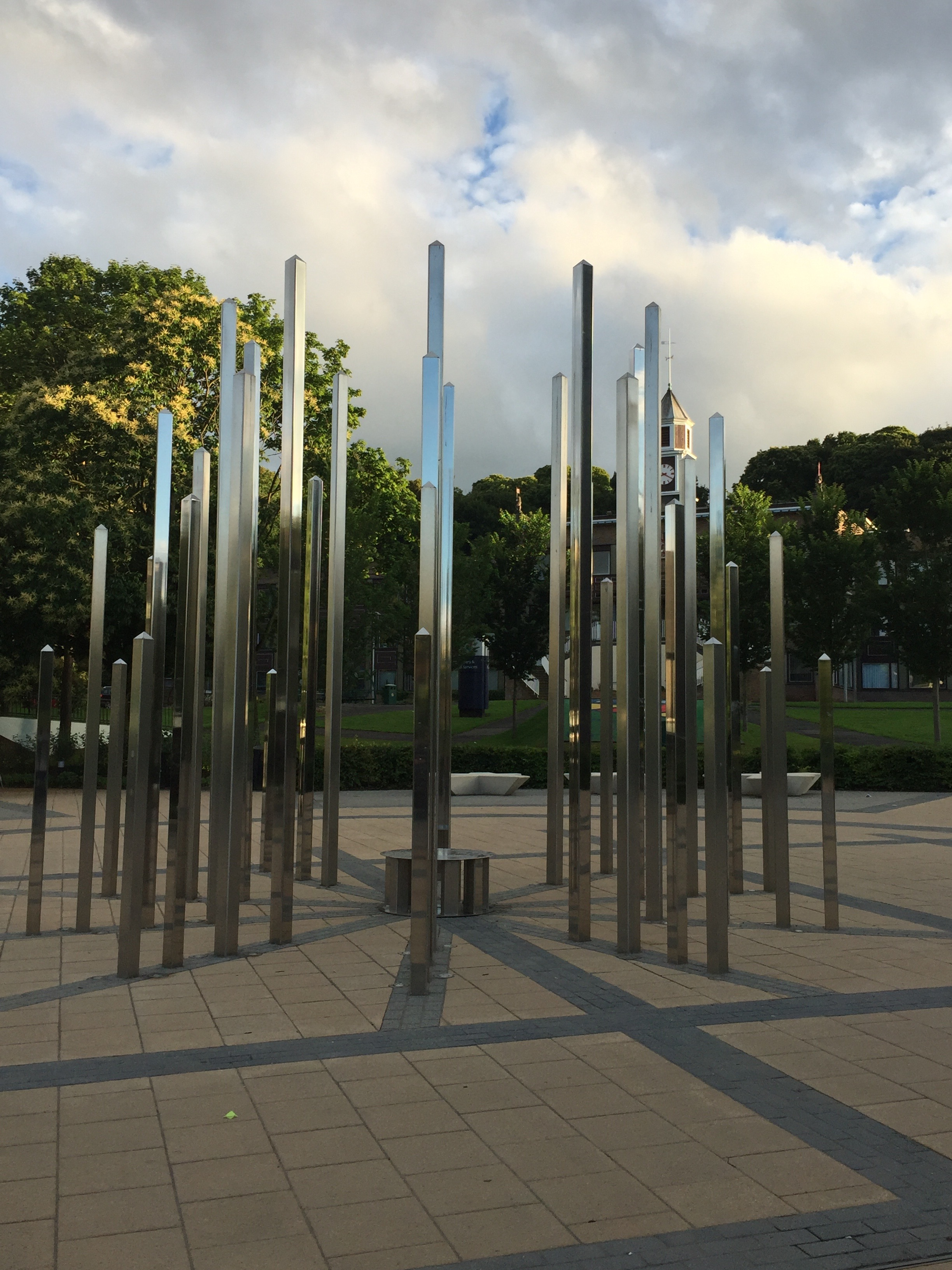
Keele University Forest of Light

Standard three-year degrees were introduced in 1973 and the numbers of students following the Foundation Year course have steadily dwindled since. The Foundation Year has never been formally discontinued, however, and remains an option for prospective students who qualify for entry into higher education, but lack subject-specific qualifications for specific degree programmes. By contrast, almost 90 per cent of current undergraduates read dual honours. Able to combine any two available subjects, students have a choice of over 500 degree courses in all. The university also offers a study abroad semester to most of its students.

As an experimental community, Keele was initially founded as a "wholly residential" institution. Of the initial intake of 159 students in October 1950, 149 were resident on campus, and it was required of the first professors appointed that they should also be in residence.

=== Faculties, Schools, and academic disciplines ===
Keele's academic activities are organised into 3 faculties, divided into the following schools and disciplines:

Faculty of Business, Law, Humanities and Social Sciences	Faculty of Natural Sciences	Faculty of Medicine and Health Sciences
School of Humanities and Social Sciences; Keele Business School; School of Law; Institute of Liberal Arts and Sciences; Foundation Years	School of Computer Science & Mathematics; School of Life Sciences; School of Engineering and Physical Sciences; School of Psychology; Harper & Keele Veterinary School	School of Medicine; School of Nursing & Midwifery; School of Allied Health Professions and Pharmacy

All undergraduate courses, with the exception of Medicine and Pharmacy, are modular, with the academic year divided into two semesters, with breaks at Christmas and Easter. There are approximately 14 students to every member of staff.

== Governance ==
The statutes of the university are laid out in its Royal Charter granted in 1962. These describe the organisational structure and powers that allow the university to function and govern its affairs. The Chancellor is appointed by an elected council every 5 years or until resignation and supplemented by a Pro-Chancellor and Deputy Pro-Chancellors. The Vice-Chancellor, also appointed by the council, requires approval from the senate and is the principal academic and administrative officer of the university. All are officers of the university.

University Officers

Principals and Vice-Chancellors

- Alexander Lindsay, 1st Baron Lindsay of Birker (1949–52)
- Sir John Lennard-Jones (1953–54)
- Sir George Barnes (1956–60)
- Harold McCarter Taylor (1961–67)
- W. A. Campbell Stewart (1967–79)
- Sir David Harrison (1979–84)
- Sir Brian Fender (1985–95)
- Dame Janet Finch (1995–2010)
- Nick Foskett (2010–15)
- Trevor McMillan (2015–2025)
- Kevin Shakesheff (2025–)

Presidents and Chancellors

- John Ryder, 5th Earl of Harrowby (1949–55)
- HRH Princess Margaret, Countess of Snowdon (1956–86)
- Claus Moser, Baron Moser (1986–2002)
- Sir David Weatherall (2002–12)
- Sir Jonathon Porritt (2012–22)
- James Timpson, Baron Timpson (2022–24)

=== University partnerships & overseas exchange programmes ===
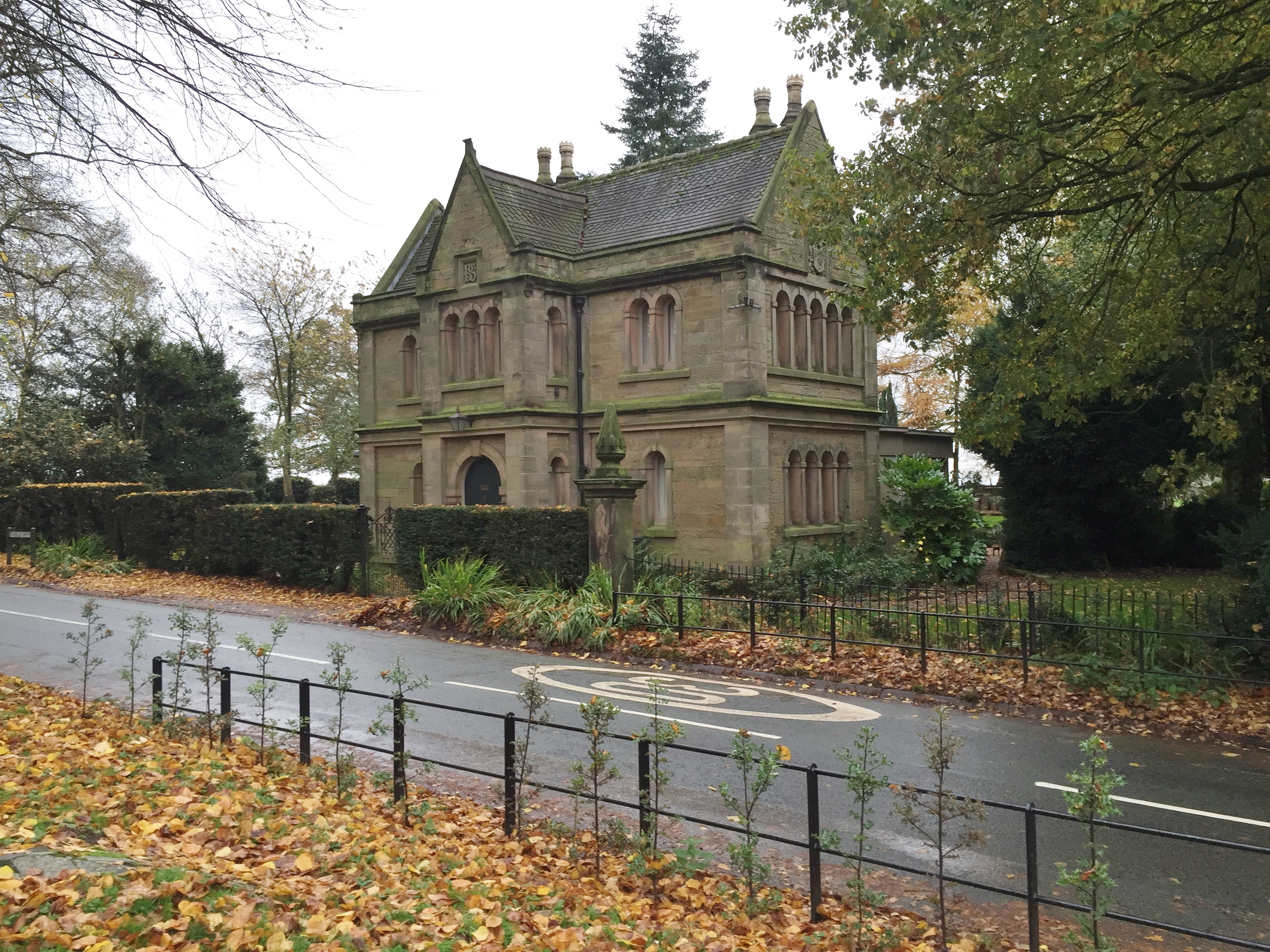
Keele University Lodge, Keele

Keele works with a wide range of international partners through its Transnational Education partnerships, supporting collaborative teaching, research and student opportunities across the world. Current partnerships include institutions in Nepal, Sri Lanka, Lithuania, South Africa, Pakistan and Morocco.

Keele also works closely with a network of university progression partners around the world, creating pathways for international students to progress onto undergraduate and postgraduate study at the University. Partners include institutions across China, Nigeria and Pakistan.

Early overseas exchange programmes in the 1950s debuted in the US with Swarthmore College, Pennsylvania and Reed College, Oregon whilst, in continental Europe, with Université de Nancy.

Today, Keele has exchange agreements with over 100 academic institutions worldwide.

=== Finance ===
According to the university's Statement of Accounts for 2024/25, the University’s total adjusted operating surplus for the year, excluding the impact of actuarial movements in staff costs, showed a marked improvement, moving from a £2.0m deficit in 2023/24 to a £2.8m surplus in 2024/25, representing 1.3% of total income.

This turnaround was achieved through a combination of strategic income growth and disciplined expenditure management (both pay and non-pay). The University continued to expand its income base while maintaining tight control over operating costs, ensuring expenditure remained aligned with available resources. Importantly, this prudent financial management enabled the University to maintain a balanced cash position, with no net cash outflow during the year, thereby safeguarding financial stability and supporting ongoing operational activities.

Tuition fees and education contracts rose by £3.0m (2.8%) to £105.7m, reflecting improved continuation rates and sustained growth in home undergraduate recruitment over the past three years, contributing approximately £2.3m. Further growth was achieved in Postgraduate Taught (PGT) Home recruitment (£1.4m) and apprenticeship income (£0.3m). These gains were partially offset by a £1.2m reduction in income from international postgraduate students, reflecting a lower intake during the year.

Capital expenditure for the year totalled £10.5m (2023/24: £20.8m), excluding finance leases. Of this, £5.3m was externally funded, supporting key strategic projects including the Newcastle Town Deal, Hydrogen Development Knowledge Exchange Programme, Office for Students Competitive Capital Grant and the Huxley Insectary Project.

=== Keele College of Fellows ===
In 2011, Keele established a college of fellows to promote the activities of the university outside the traditional realm of academia. Current members includes alumni who have demarcated themselves in the field of industry, media and/or public service as well as key stakeholders from in and around Staffordshire.

== Academic profile and reputation ==
Rankings
National rankings
- Complete (2027): 54
- Guardian (2027): 55
- Times / Sunday Times (2027): 46

Global rankings
- ARWU (2026): 801–900
- QS (2027): 801–850
- THE (2026): 501–600

In 2026, Keele University was named University of the Year at the Student Social Mobility Awards 2026, recognising its sector-leading work to widen access to higher education and improve outcomes for students from disadvantaged backgrounds.

Keele is one of only 15 broad-based universities in England - out of over 100 - to have been awarded Gold in both the 2017 and 2023 Teaching Excellence Framework.

=== Admissions ===
Keele's admissions process promotes equality of opportunity and assesses applicants on their potential and motivation to succeed, regardless of background. In addition to academic achievement, the university considers evidence of subject knowledge, relevant interests and responsibilities, and an applicant’s readiness to meet the demands of higher education.

==== UCAS clearing ====
Keele has traditionally participated in the UCAS clearing process and it has become customary for the university to lower its requirements to fill outstanding places. In August 2023, the university reduced its academic demands to 64 UCAS points or higher equivalent to 2 A'Levels at grades C in dual and single honours degree programmes with vacancies remaining.

=== Teaching ===
In the National Student Survey 2025 (NSS), Keele ranked among the Top 10 in England for 15 subject different areas. Chemistry ranked No.1 in the UK with 96% of students expressing satisfaction with their course, with Astrophysics, Biology, Geography, Medicine, Midwifery, and Pharmacy all in the Top 5 in England. Ranking in the Top 10 in England are English, Forensic Sciences, Geology, Human Biology, Politics, Physics, and Social Work. Harper & Keele Veterinary School has also been ranked No.1 in the UK for Veterinary Medicine, with 91.4% of students expressing satisfaction with their course.

Keele University was awarded the highest rating for the quality of its educational offer in the Teaching Excellence Framework (TEF) 2023. Published by the Office for Students (OfS), Keele achieved a Gold rating overall, maintaining its Gold standard achieved in the previous exercise in 2017. The TEF assessment identifies excellence in the educational experience and outcomes of our students, focusing on all undergraduate courses and students. In 2022, Keele was ranked by students as being the best in the UK in the nationwide Student Crowd Awards.

== Research ==
Research Excellence Framework (REF 2021) results for Keele indicated a 75% increase in the volume of world-leading research across the university compared to the last REF in 2014, with 80% of Keele's research being classified as either world-leading or internationally excellent (4* or 3* rated research). Keele was one of 157 UK universities which participated in REF 2021, which collectively submitted evidence from over 76,000 academic staff.

Keele ranks in a 'Golden Quadrangle' of the top 15 universities in England that excel in both teaching and research, all with a Gold award in the 2023 Teaching Excellence Framework and also high research intensity in the most-recent Research Excellence Framework.

Keele submitted 60% of its staff to the 2014 Research Assessment Exercise (RAE) and ranked 57 of 128 institutions by grade point average (GPA) The university scored particularly well in public health, health services and primary care. Medical research includes detecting Parkinson's disease early, and using stem cell research to aid the healing process. The cochlear implant was developed in the Department of Communication and Neuroscience at Keele. Other notable medical pursuits includes attempts to explain the evolution of the human brain, looking into links between cannabis and mental illness (cited in the 2009 reclassification debate), as well as tumour and cancer research. In August 2009, university astronomers, led by David Anderson, discovered the first planet that orbits in the opposite direction to the spin of its star. The planet was named WASP-17b. In 2010 Richard Stephens, John Atkins, and Andrew Kingston won the Ig Nobel prize for confirming the widely held belief that swearing relieves pain. In 2010 a medical centre in Newport, Shropshire was completed, for students to learn in real medical situations and to research medical sciences.

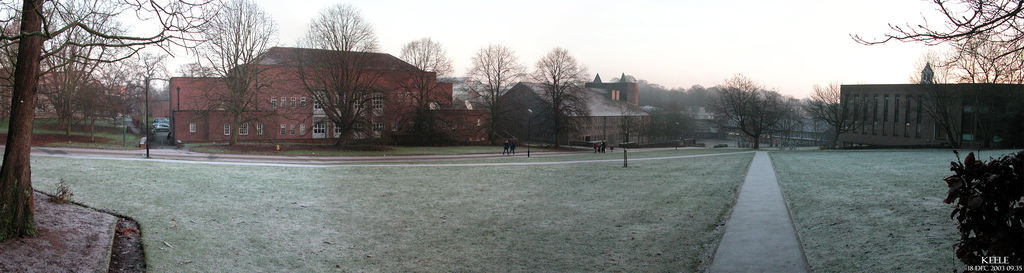
Keele University Concourse on a winter morning

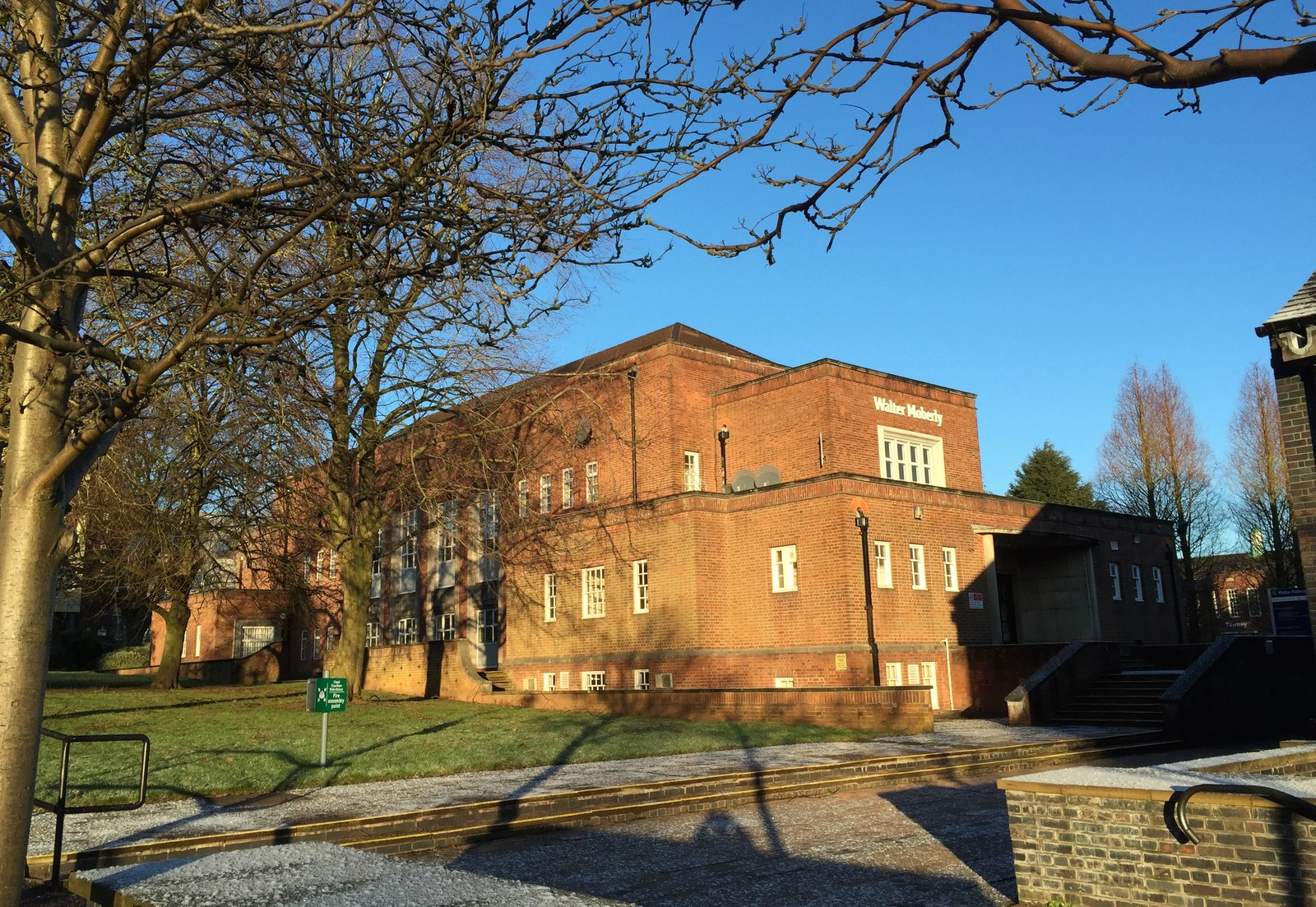
Keele University Walter Moberly Building

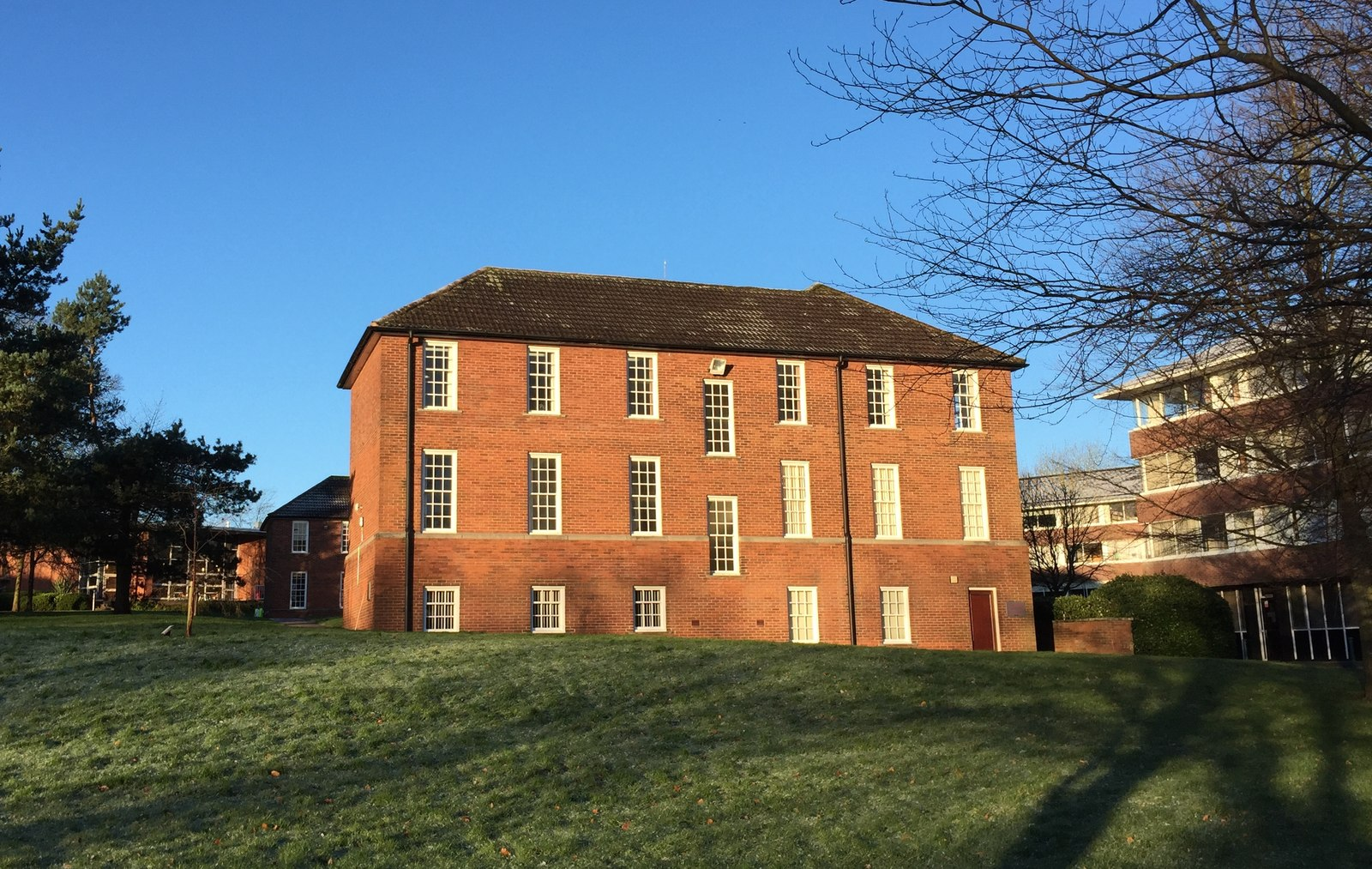
Keele University Tawney Building

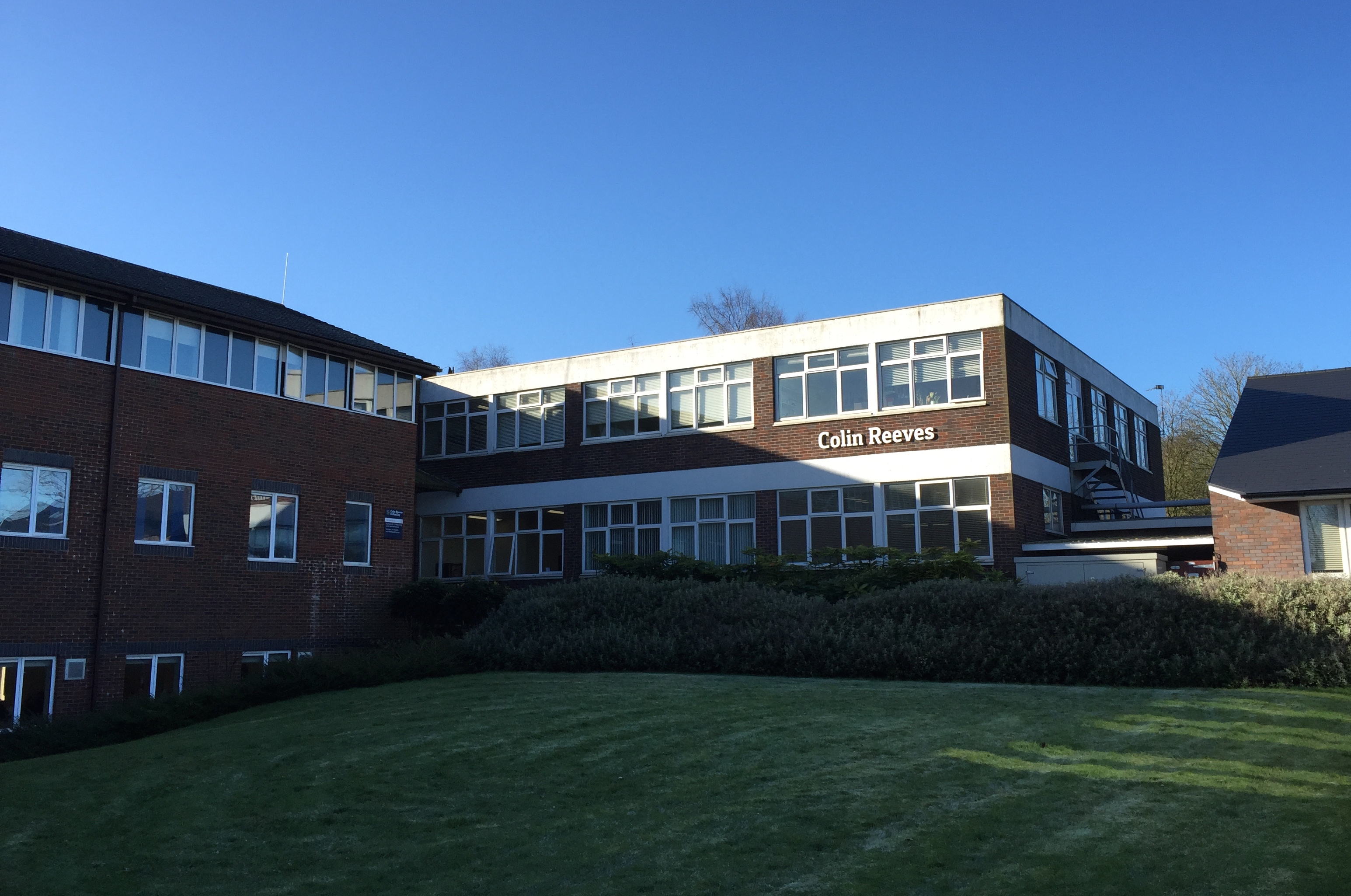
Keele University Colin Reeves Building

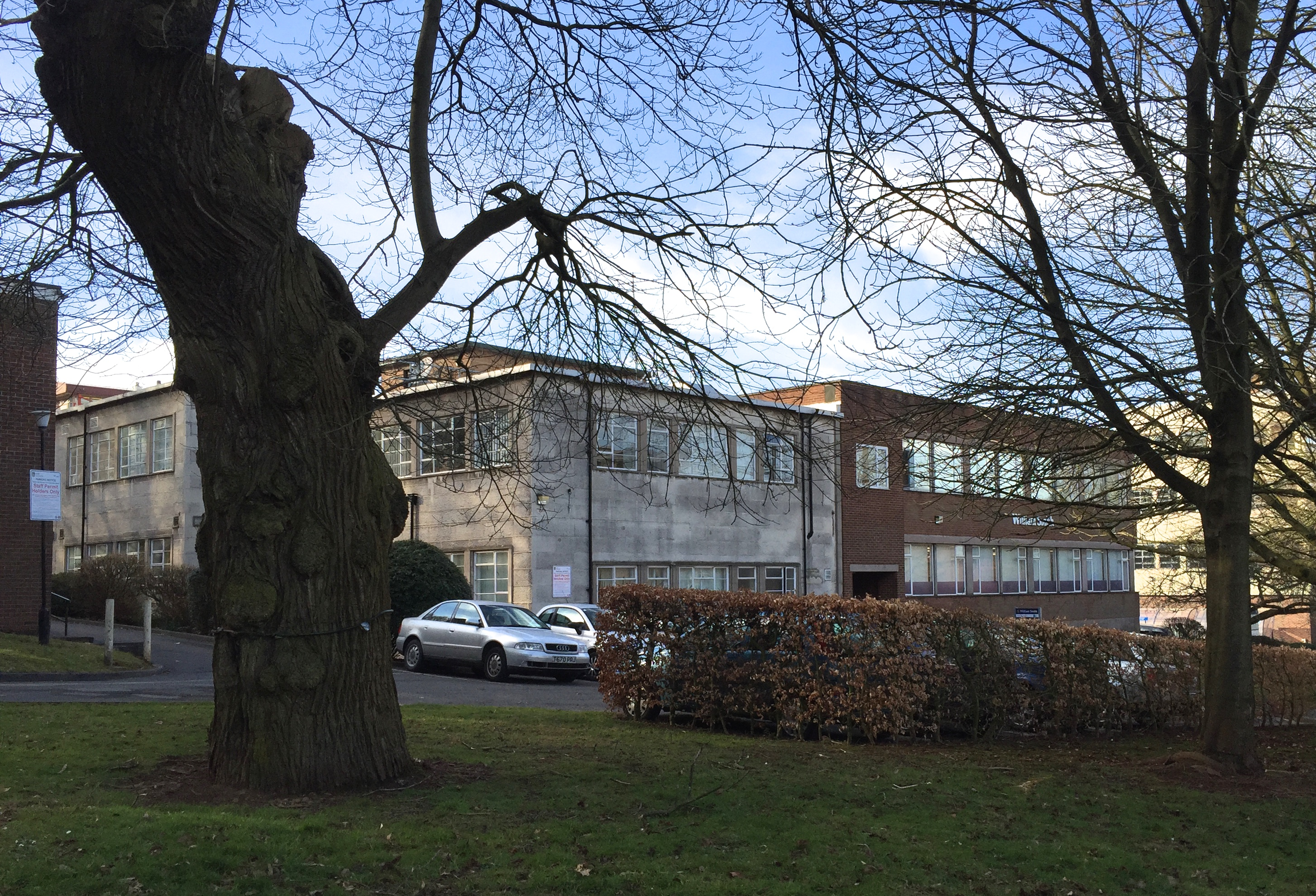
Keele University William Smith Building (home of 'The Two Magnificent Ralfs')

== Student life ==
=== Students' Union ===
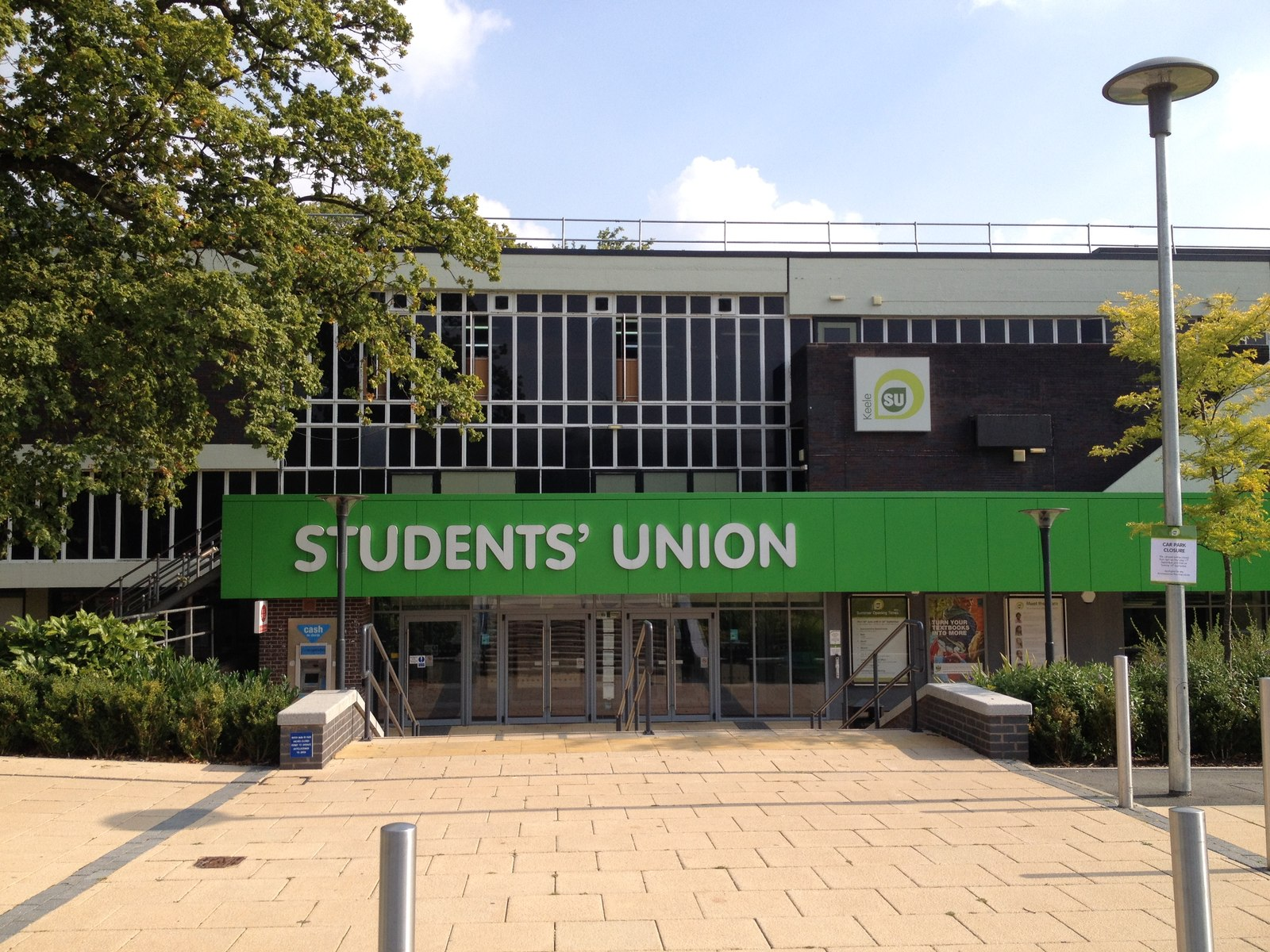
Keele University Students' Union

Keele University Students' Union organises social activities throughout the year. The principal Students' Union building was designed by Stillman & Eastwick-Field (now part of the T. P. Bennett practice), with some guidance from the university's architect, J. A. Pickavance. It opened in 1962 and was completed in 1963, extended in the 1970s and the ground-floor interior remodelled in 2011–2012. Its magazine, Concourse, was founded in 1964 and is issued monthly during term time. Concourse is editorially independent of both the university and the students' union. Princess Margaret, as Chancellor of the university, with her husband, attended the student union Christmas Ball on Monday 7 December 1964. Princess Margaret danced with the President of the student union, and her husband danced with the Vice-President, attending until 3am.

The ballroom inside the Students' Union regularly hosts concerts and events and boasts a legendary music history, hosting famous bands from the late 1960s through the 1980s and beyond, including Pink Floyd, Jethro Tull, U2, Dire Straits, UB40, The Kinks, and The Pretenders, often at the beginning of their musical career.

=== Student activity ===
The Keele team won the 1968 series of University Challenge. The same team also made runner up to Sidney Sussex College, Cambridge (1979) in the 2002 special University Challenge: Reunited.

=== Student sports ===
Keele sports range from rugby to lacrosse and dodgeball. Sports teams and issues raised are managed by the Athletic Union. The sports cente on campus has numerous indoor and outdoor facilities including a gym, sports hall, squash courts, bouldering wall, 3G pitches, beach volleyball courts, rugby, football and lacrosse pitches and basketball, netball and tennis courts and a running track.

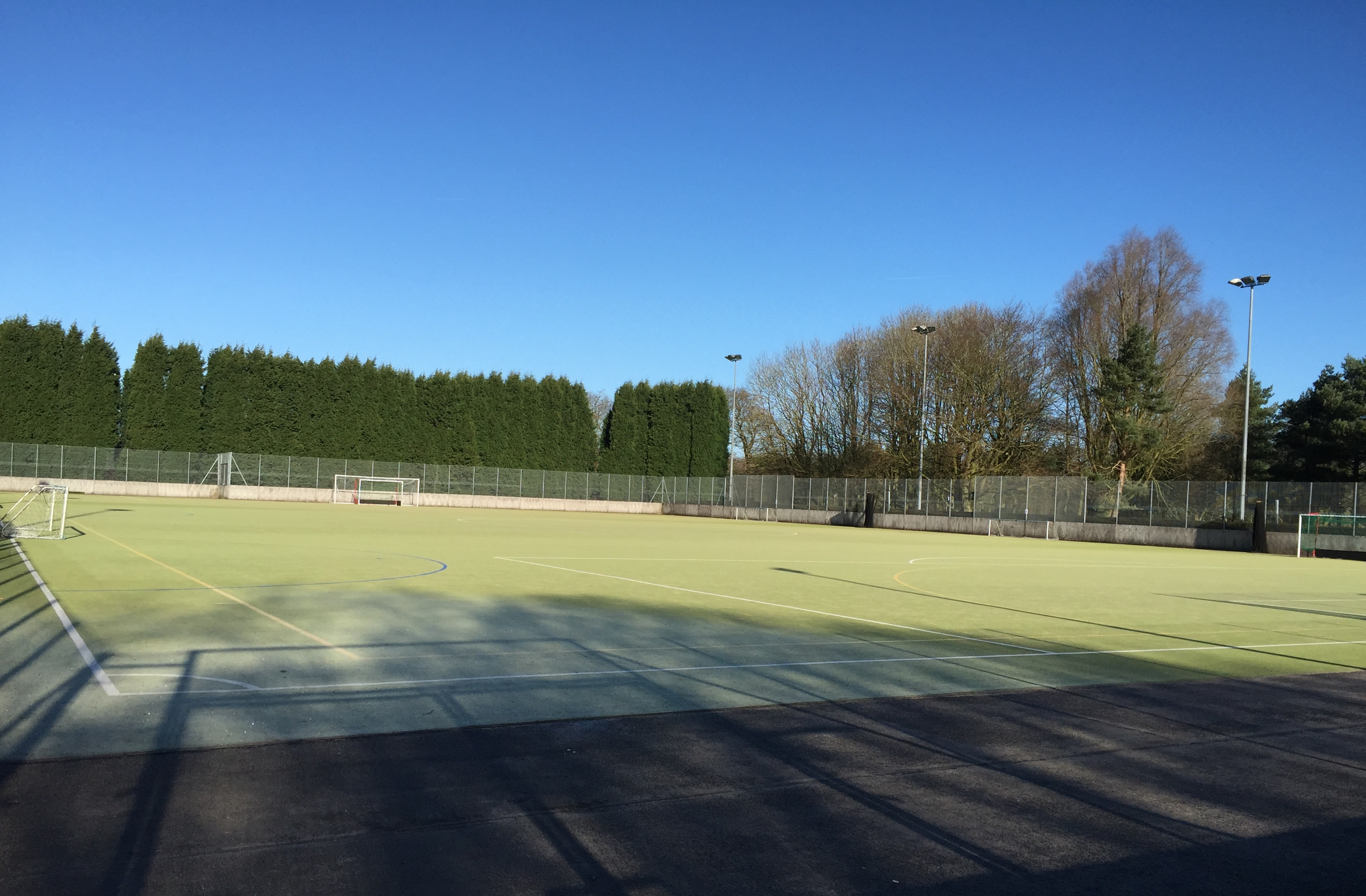
Keele University all weather football pitch

==== Varsity ====
Keele University's Athletic Union plays an annual multi-sports series against the neighbouring University of Staffordshire. The event was founded as a charity football match in 2001. The varsity match occurs at both universities sports facilities, alternating between the venues each year. Sports included in the contest include football, cricket, rugby, badminton, lacrosse, swimming, volleyball, netball, hockey, fencing, tennis, basketball and frisbee. Team Keele and Team Staffs went head to head across a record 23 sports in 2017. Keele has won the varsity trophy in 2008, 2010, 2011, 2012, 2013, 2014, 2015, 2016, 2017, 2018, 2019, 2022, 2024, 2025 and 2026. University of Staffordshire won in 2007, 2009, 2023 & 2026.

== In popular culture ==
Keele University featured prominently in Marvellous, the biographical film about honorary graduate Neil Baldwin broadcast on BBC Two in September 2014. The BBC filmed parts of its surreal comedy A Very Peculiar Practice (1986–1988) at the Keele University campus and students played extra parts.
