= Nottingham University School of Pharmacy =

Academic department of the University of Nottingham

Coordinates: 52.9399°N 1.1900°W

The University of Nottingham School of Pharmacy was founded in 1925 and is located in the University Park Campus of the university. The school also offers courses at the University's Malaysia campus in Kuala Lumpur with students spending two years in Malaysia and two years in Nottingham The School also offers the first joint Pharmacy course with China, with the Tianjin University of Traditional Chinese Medicine (TUTCM). The current head of The School is Professor Barrie Kellam (2021-).

== Courses ==
The University of Nottingham School of Pharmacy offers the following undergraduate courses, Master of Pharmacy (4-year and 5-year with integrated pre-reg), a 4-year MSci in Pharmaceutical Sciences with a year in industry, Medicinal and Biological Chemistry BSci Hons (Malaysia), as well as the five-year International Pharmacy programme with TUTCM. The School also offers a 1 and 2-year taught postgraduate MSc in Drug Discovery along with an extensive postgraduate research programme.

== Organisation of School of Pharmacy on the University Park Campus ==
The School is based in three buildings within the main campus. 1. The School of Pharmacy building is the main teaching building and houses a teaching pharmacy, a complex for Pharmacy Leadership training, teaching laboratories and the Division of Pharmacy Practice and Policy. 2. The Biodiscovery Institute is a multidisciplinary research centre with several groups based there from the School from the Divisions of Biomolecular Science and Medicinal Chemistry and Regenerative Medicine and Cellular Therapies. School staff together with over 300 scientists from across seven different scientific disciplines work here to tackle key health priorities in drug discovery, cancer research, stem cell science, bacteriology and regenerative medicine. 3. The Boots Science Building is another research building, housing the Divisions of Advanced Materials and Healthcare Technologies and Molecular Therapeutics and Formulation. The EPSRC Advanced Therapeutics and Nanomedicines Doctoral Training Centre is housed in this building, and works in collaboration with UCL and a number of pharmaceutical industry partners to deliver PhD training in collaborative, fundamental, multidisciplinary and pharmaceutical focused research.

== Rankings and Reputation ==
Ibuprofen is one of many medicines being widely used today which were invented in Nottingham. Prof Malcolm Stevens FRS, now Emeritus Professor in the School developed the anti-cancer drug Temozolomide whilst working at Nottingham and Aston University. It has been available in the United States since August 1999, and in other countries since the early 2000s. A number of spin-outs have also come from the School, including Molecular Profiles Ltd and Pharmaceutical Profiles now Quotient Clinical.
