= Sadie Creese =

British cybersecurity specialist

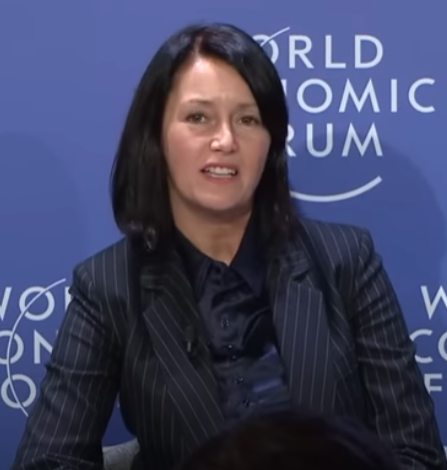
- Speaking at the 2023 World Economic Forum
- Education: B.Sc. (mathematics and philosophy); M.Sc. (computation); D.Phil. (computer science)
- Alma mater: University of Oxford
- Occupation: Professor of Cybersecurity in the Department of Computer Science, University of Oxford

Sadie Creese is a British cybersecurity specialist. She is Professor of Cybersecurity in the Department of Computer Science at the University of Oxford, Director of the Global Cyber Security Capacity Centre at the Oxford Martin School, co-director of the university's Cyber Security Centre and of the Martin School's Institute for the Future of Computing, and a fellow of Worcester College, Oxford.

== Biography ==
She has a B.Sc. (mathematics and philosophy), M.Sc. (computation) and D.Phil. (computer science, 2001) from the University of Oxford. Her doctoral thesis title was "Data independent induction : CSP model checking of arbitrary sized networks" and her thesis adviser was Bill Roscoe.

Creese worked at Qinetiq where she was Director of Strategic Programmes in the Trusted Information Management Division, and from 2007 to 2011 was Professor and Director of e-Security at the International Digital Laboratory at the University of Warwick, before moving to Oxford. Her research interests include "threat modelling and detection with particular interest in the insider threat and threat from AI, visual analytics for cybersecurity, risk propagation logics and communication, resilience strategies for business, privacy requirements, vulnerability of distributed ledgers and block-chains, understanding cyber-harm and how it emerges for single organisations, nations and the potential for systemic cyber-risk, and the Cyber Security Capacity Maturity Model for Nations" and she teaches "operational aspects of cybersecurity including threat detection, risk assessment and security architectures". She also lectures on cybersecurity in the Blavatnik School of Government and the Saïd Business School.

The Engineering and Physical Sciences Research Council has recognised her as a RISE Leader ("Recognising Inspirational Scientists and Engineers").
