= Engineering biology =

Engineering biology is the set of methods for designing, building, and testing engineered biological systems which have been used to manipulate information, construct materials, process chemicals, produce energy, provide food, and help maintain or enhance human health and environment.

== History ==
Rapid advances in the ability to genetically modify biological organisms have advanced a new engineering discipline, commonly referred to as synthetic biology. This approach seeks to harness the power of living systems for a variety of manufacturing applications, such as advanced therapeutics, sustainable fuels, chemical feedstocks, and advanced materials. To date, research in synthetic biology has typically relied on trial-and-error approaches, which are costly, laborious, and inefficient. Engineering biology methods include a combination of traditional biological techniques such as bioinformatics, molecular biology, and wet cell biology, as well as conventional engineering practices such as design and computation.

== Bibliography ==
- H.R.4521 - America COMPETES Act of 2022

https://www.congress.gov/congressional-record/2022/03/17/senate-section/article/S1237-5

- Schuergers, N., Werlang, C., Ajo-Franklin, C., & Boghossian, A. (2017). A Synthetic Biology Approach to Engineering Living Photovoltaics. Energy & Environmental Science. doi:10.1039/C7EE00282C
- Teague, B. P., Guye, P., & Weiss, R. (2016). Synthetic Morphogenesis. Cold Spring Harbor Perspectives in Biology, 8(9), a023929. doi:10.1101/cshperspect.a023929
- Kelley, N. J. (2015). Engineering Biology for Science & Industry : Accelerating Progress. http://nancyjkelley.com/wp-content/uploads/Meeting-Summary.Final_.6.9.15-Formatted.pdf
- H.R.591. - Engineering Biology Research and Development Act of 2015. https://www.congress.gov/bill/114th-congress/house-bill/591
- Kelley, N. J. (2014). The promise and challenge of engineering biology in the United States. Industrial Biotechnology, 10(3), 137–139. doi:10.1089/ind.2014.1516
- ↑ Beal, J., Weiss, R., Densmore, D., Adler, A., Babb, J., Bhatia, S., ... & Loyall, J. (2011, June). TASBE: A tool-chain to accelerate synthetic biological engineering. In Proceedings of the 3rd International Workshop on Bio-Design Automation (pp. 19–21). http://citeseerx.ist.psu.edu/viewdoc/download?doi=10.1.1.467.7189&rep=rep1&type=pdf
- Schrödinger, E. (1946). What is life?: the physical aspect of the living cell. Cambridge.
- Engineering Biology Problems Book. 2016. doi:10.2139/ssrn.2898429
