= Engineering and Physical Sciences Research Council =

British research funding body

Council overview
- Formed: 1994; 32 years ago
- Status: Council within UK Research and Innovation
- Headquarters: Swindon, Wiltshire, England
- Annual budget: £641 million (FY2024/25)
- Ministers responsible: Liz Kendall MP, Secretary of State for Science, Innovation and Technology; Patrick Vallance, Minister of State for Science, Research and Innovation
- Council executive: Charlotte Deane, Executive Chair
- Parent department: Department for Science, Innovation and Technology
- Parent body: UK Research and Innovation

The Engineering and Physical Sciences Research Council (EPSRC) is a council of UK Research and Innovation (UKRI), a non-departmental public body sponsored by the Department for Science, Innovation and Technology, responsible for funding grants to undertake research and postgraduate degrees in engineering and the physical sciences, mainly to universities in the United Kingdom. EPSRC research areas include mathematics, physics, chemistry, artificial intelligence and computer science, but exclude particle physics, nuclear physics, space science and astronomy (which fall under the remit of the Science and Technology Facilities Council).

== History ==
EPSRC was created in 1994. At first part of the Science and Engineering Research Council (SERC), in 2018 it was one of nine organisations brought together to form UK Research and Innovation (UKRI).

Its head office is in Swindon, Wiltshire, in the same building (Polaris House) that houses the AHRC, BBSRC, ESRC, MRC, Natural Environment Research Council, Science and Technology Facilities Council, TSB, Research Councils UK and the UK Space Agency.

== Key people ==
Paul Golby, Chair of EngineeringUK, was appointed as the Chairman of the EPSRC from 1 April 2012 for four years. He succeeded Sir John Armitt.

From 2007 to March 2014, the chief executive and deputy chair of EPSRC was David Delpy, a medical physicist and formerly vice provost at University College London. He was succeeded in April 2014 by Philip Nelson, former University of Southampton pro vice-chancellor for research and enterprise. In April 2016 Professor Tom Rodden was appointed as the Deputy CEO of EPSRC, a new position created to work alongside Philip Nelson while he also acts as Chair of RCUK Strategic Executive. Rodden joins the EPSRC on secondment from the University of Nottingham where he is currently Professor of Computing and Co-Director of Horizon Digital Economy Research.

In October 2018 Nelson was succeeded by Lynn Gladden in the new role of Executive Chair.

== Functions ==
In addition to funding academic research projects, the EPSRC also funds Centres for Doctoral Training (CDTs). These deliver four-year doctoral training programmes to cohorts of PhD students and EngD research engineers studying within UK universities, and are funded to target specific areas of research for which there is recognised need. In 2008, the EPSRC announced funding for 44 new CDTs spanning its entire remit.

The EPSRC also funds or joint-funds 'Innovation and Knowledge Centres'. These are university-based business incubators which support commercialisation of emerging technologies. Between 2007 and 2016, the EPSRC funded seven centres:

- Cambridge Innovation and Knowledge Centre (CIKC): Advanced Manufacturing Technologies for Photonics and Electronics – University of Cambridge
- Ultra Precision and Structured Surfaces (UPS2) – Cranfield University
- Centre for Secure Information Technologies (CSIT) -Queen's University Belfast
- Medical Technologies IKC – University of Leeds
- Sustainable Product Engineering Centre for Innovative Functional Industrial Coatings (SPECIFIC) – Swansea University
- Centre for Smart Infrastructure and Construction (CSIC) – University of Cambridge
- Synthetic Biology Innovation and Commercialisation Industrial translation Engine (SynbiCITE) – Imperial College London

Since 2013, the ESPRC has funded i-Sense, an interdisciplinary research collaboration which develops early warning sensing systems for infectious diseases.

In 2020, ESPRC received £22 million from UKRI to be used (alongside money from industry and the universities involved) to fund five "next stage digital economy" centres. Projects will be run by the universities of Bath, Newcastle, Northumbria, Nottingham, Surrey and Lancaster.

== RISE ==
In 2014 the ESPRC established its RISE awards – Recognising Inspirational Scientists and Engineers. The awards recognise inspirational leaders of innovation as RISE Leaders; those who are fellows of the Royal Society, Royal Academy of Engineering or Academy of Medical Sciences as RISE Fellows; future leaders nominated by RISE Leaders as Rising Stars; and EPSRC-supported researchers with an interest in policy and evidence-based decision making as RISE Connectors. As of October 2020, those named as RISE leaders are:

- Jim Al-Khalili
- Sadie Creese
- Leroy Cronin
- Stephen Haake
- Jenny Nelson
- Jeremy O'Brien
- Rodrigo Quian Quiroga
- Kevin Shakesheff
