= James Creese =

American academic administrator

James Creese (June 19, 1896, Leetsdale, Pennsylvania – February 8, 1966, Colorado Springs, Colorado) was the vice president of Stevens Institute of Technology and the president of the Drexel Institute of Technology.

== Early life ==
Born in Leetsdale, Pennsylvania in 1896 Creese attended public schools both in Leetsdale and Pittsburgh in his formative years. He went on to attend Princeton University in 1914, concentrating on the humanities and becoming a poet, where he received his bachelor's degree in 1918. During World War I and his enrollment at Princeton Creese enlisted in the Army and served as Second Lieutenant in the artillery division. After the war ended Creese went back to Princeton for post graduate work and earned and his master's degree in 1920.

After the war ended he became the Secretary General of The American-Scandinavian Foundation and traveled extensively in Sweden. He married a fellow Pennsylvanian, Margaret Villiers Morton, in Sweden in 1925. He was named a Knight of the Order of Vasa in Sweden in 1928 the year that he was appointed the Vice-President and Treasurer of Stevens Institute of Technology located in Hoboken, New Jersey, where he worked until 1945. At Stevens, Creese instituted an abridged program of cooperative education with the Stevens War Industries Training School. He also focused on funding and public relations at Stevens.

== Drexel Institute ==
Creese became President of Drexel Institute in 1945, as the Second World War was ending. The war years had brought new focus to war efforts in the curriculum at Drexel, as well as substantial administrative changes. The period immediately following the war saw a surge in students at Drexel, resulting in a need for more buildings for classes and laboratories. Drexel had been continuously updating their facilities, but the post war years demanded an even bigger dedication to increasing the amount of space on campus for student use. Most students lived off campus during this time period.

During Creese's long presidency at Drexel, many changes occurred in every academic department. One of the changes involved cooperative education which began to be included in the curriculum of more departments and was more connected to academic study. A new emphasis on research resulted in Drexel receiving state aid for projects. During Creese's administration Drexel aimed to be a school similar to MIT, with an emphasis on technology, but also a strong humanities department in the undergraduate division. Students in all of the individual schools, including engineering and business, received a humanities education.

As Drexel's president, Dr. Creese presided over unprecedented growth in the department of engineering, adding new engineering specialties. The Engineering School began offering graduate courses in the early 1950s. Female students were first allowed into Drexel's program in 1943, but they were a small percentage of total students and were often unemployed after finishing at Drexel during the 1940s and 1950s. The Evening School became a more integrated aspect of Drexel. Students were allowed to transfer courses from the Evening to the Day School beginning in 1947. The Evening School had been offering a diploma, but in the late 1940s Drexel began to offer an accredited degree. All of these changes strengthened Drexel as a center for higher education. The growth of Drexel as a graduate school was similar to many other colleges in the country during this time period.

In 1956 Creese went to visit the Soviet Union, as part of an educational mission, solidifying his belief in the importance of the engineering program at Drexel. Creese thought that the Soviets were substantially more technologically advanced than the United States at that time. While Creese's trip to the Soviet Union reinforced his belief in the need to strengthen the School of Engineering, the entire college benefited from the increased focus on research and education.

The administration of Drexel became more institutionalized, with succinct departments and new administrative offices. The Dean of Faculty became more responsible for daily operations than in previous decades. There was also an increase in the number of departments and committees in the academic and administrative offices of the college. An Office of Admissions led by George Galphin opened in 1954. Drexel highlighted cooperative education as a strong incentive for students in the 1950s. The Middle States Association and the Engineering Council for Professional Development made accreditation visits to Drexel in 1953 and 1962, respectively. There were also two major fundraising campaigns, one in 1947 and the other near the end of Creese's tenure in 1962. There was a huge program for development during his tenure due to the concentration on new academic buildings for the school.

During Creese's presidency Drexel built a large number of new facilities including the Engineering Laboratories Building (1950), a Basic Science Center (1955), the Korman Library Center (1959), a Campus Activities Center (1962), and a Classroom-Laboratories Building (1963).

Creese was involved with numerous outside organizations while he was president of Drexel. He was a member of the governing boards of Drexel, the Franklin Institute, and the Philadelphia College of Textiles and Science, the Chamber of Commerce, Philadelphia Fellowship Commission, and the Pen-Jer-Del (Pennsylvania-New Jersey-Delaware Metropolitan Project, Incorporated) among others. He was a chairman of the Pennsylvania Governor's Committee on Unemployment Compensation. He was a part of the Philadelphia City Planning Commission from 1956 to 1959, the board of the Pennsylvania State Highway Professional Personnel Board, and was a Trustee of the Baldwin School, a private school outside of Philadelphia. Creese was on a panel for the Department of Defense and their Reserve Officers' Training Corps Program (ROTC) in 1950. He was a member, and director, of the John and Mary R. Markle Foundation until the time of his death.

He received ten honorary degrees during his lifetime. He was a member of the Phi Beta Kappa and the Phi Kappa Phi societies. He was the President of the National Association of Urban Universities from 1949–1950. He was on the Executive Committee of the Pennsylvania Association of Colleges and Universities from 1962 to 1963. Creese was also on the Board of the American Association for Adult Education from 1942–1949.

== After Drexel ==
Creese announced his resignation from the Presidency of Drexel in February 1963. He moved to Princeton, New Jersey where he continued to work as a board member on multiple foundations. Creese died of a heart attack in Colorado Springs, Colorado on February 8, 1966 while attending a scholarship allocation conference for the Markle Foundation.
