= SynbiCITE =

Coordinates: 51°29′58″N 0°10′32″W

- Formation: 2013
- Type: Business Incubator
- Purpose: Supporting synthetic biology in industry
- Headquarters: Imperial College London
- Affiliations: Innovate UK, EPSRC, BBSRC
- Website: SynbiCITE.com

SynbiCITE is the UK's national Innovation and Knowledge Centre (IKC) for the adoption and use of synthetic biology by industry. It also helps to incubate new businesses by providing them with space and accelerator programs, including funding, training and mentoring.

== History ==
SynbiCITE was created in 2013 after a UK-wide competition to find the most suitable host university with the best strategic plan. Initially funded by the government and other partners for five years, the organization was intended to become self-sustaining by 2018. In April 2016, SynbiCITE opened the Synthetic Biology Foundry, a Research Councils UK-funded facility providing remote gene design, construction, and validation services using laboratory robotics. Based on a similar facility at MIT, it is the first commercial facility in the United Kingdom using laboratory automation to provide on-demand services specifically for synthetic biology.

In 2019, the DNA Foundry opened at Imperial College London's White City Campus. Its goal is to enable businesses to outsource DNA manufacture, design, and testing and accelerate the development of DNA-based technologies in the UK. SynbiCITE also supported the development of OpenCell, which provides affordable biotechnology labs using shipping containers in White City.

== Organisation ==
SynbiCITE is headquartered at Imperial College London. It is funded by a public-private partnership between the EPSRC, BBSRC, and Innovate UK, as well as several industrial and private investors. It is run and managed by a board consisting of two co-directors (Professor Richard Kitney and Professor Paul Freemont).
