= Paolo Buoni =

Italian-British activist

- Born: Paolo Buoni; Italy
- Education: Edinburgh Napier University
- Occupation: Chartered (professional) Renewable Energy Marketing
- Known for: Promoting with the United Nations Environment the adoption of sustainable technology and best practice in education around the globe Renewable Energy Institute, Founder and Director; European Energy Centre Director; European Centre of Technology Director; Edinburgh Napier University notable people
- Title: Founder and Director, Renewable Energy Institute, European Energy Centre (from 2010)
- Website: www.buoni.co.uk

Paolo Buoni is a British-Italian renewable energy advocate and marketer. Founder and director of the Renewable Energy Institute (REI). An alumnus of Edinburgh Napier University, he has been promoting best practices in renewable energy education, collaborating with international institutions such as the United Nations Environment Programme (UNEP).

Buoni is a Chartered Marketer, a professional designation awarded by the Chartered Institute of Marketing (CIM).

== Career ==
Buoni established the European Energy Centre (EEC) as a platform for delivering international training courses in renewable energy. The organization trains professionals, focusing on areas such as solar energy, wind power, and energy efficiency. Buoni has also collaborated with academic institutions, including Edinburgh Napier University, to host events and develop educational programs aimed at assisting innovation in renewable energy technologies.

== Regarded for ==
Buoni has forged connections with various international organizations. He played a role in launching the Green New Deal in collaboration with UNEP, which led to an increase in businesses adopting renewable energy technologies in Italy. Additionally, he organized a seminar in Maharashtra, India, in partnership with TERRE Policy Centre and Centro Studi Galileo, to promote solar energy solutions.

== Contributions ==
"Paolo Buoni" has been recognized for his contributions to the renewable energy sector. He was featured in Casale News for receiving an award for promoting sustainable energy solutions globally. He works in promoting renewable energy education.

Buoni has been actively involved in organizing events in collaboration with international organizations. For example, he played a role in hosting a renewable energy event at Edinburgh Napier University, organized in cooperation with the United Nations Environment Programme.
