= Andrea Nolan =

Irish-born British veterinary surgeon and senior academic

Andrea Nolan CBE FRSE MRCVS
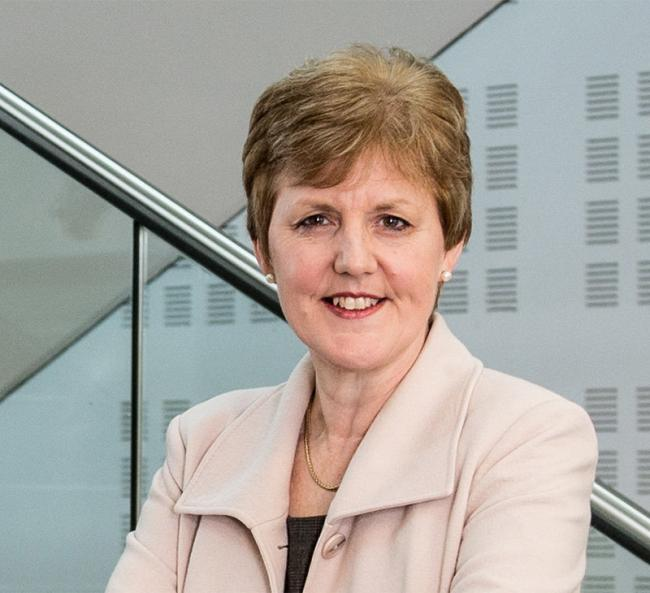

Principal & Vice Chancellor of Edinburgh Napier University
- In office 2013–2024
- Chancellor: Tim Waterstone; David Eustace; Will Whitehorn
- Preceded by: Dame Joan Stringer
- Succeeded by: Sue Rigby

Personal details
- Education: Trinity College Dublin
- Profession: Veterinary surgeon

Andrea Nolan, CBE, FRSE, MRCVS is Professor of Veterinary Pharmacology and formerly Principal & Vice Chancellor of Edinburgh Napier University. In 1999, she was the first woman ever appointed to head a British veterinary school.

== Early life and education ==
After completing secondary education at Manor House School, Raheny, Nolan studied veterinary medicine at Trinity College Dublin. After a brief period with a veterinary practice, she undertook postgraduate study at the universities of Bristol and Cambridge and the Technical University of Munich.

== Career ==
Nolan was appointed a lecturer at the University of Glasgow in 1989 and professor of veterinary pharmacology in 1998. She continues to hold the latter post and remains active in research focused on pain in animals. Nolan further pursued advanced clinical training, and received a diploma from the Royal College of Veterinary Surgeons, as well as recognition from the European College of Veterinary Pharmacology and Toxicology, and the European College of Veterinary Anaesthesia.

In 1999, she was appointed dean of the Faculty of Veterinary Medicine, the first female dean at the university and the first woman to lead a British vet school.

=== Vice-principal ===
In 2004, she was appointed vice-principal of the university with responsibility for learning and teaching, and in 2006 took on additional responsibility for internationalisation. At the same time, Anton Muscatelli, dean of the Faculty of Social Sciences, was appointed vice-principal for strategy, budgeting and advancement. In 2009, Muscatelli was appointed principal of the university and shortly afterwards promoted Nolan to the new post of senior vice-principal and deputy vice-chancellor; Frank Coton, dean of the Faculty of Engineering, was appointed vice-principal for learning and teaching. In her new role, Nolan had particular responsibility for restructuring the university's nine faculties into four new colleges.

=== Principal and vice chancellor ===
Nolan was appointed principal and vice chancellor of Edinburgh Napier University in 2013, succeeding Dame Joan Stringer to the post, and announced plans for a new university strategy for 2014–2019. She remained in post until December 2024 when she was succeeded by Professor Sue Rigby.

== Other roles ==
Nolan is, as of 2021, chair of the Interface Strategic Board and a board member or trustee of Medical Research Scotland, the Universities and Colleges Employers Association, the Moredun Foundation and the Universities Federation for Animal Welfare. She is Convenor of the International Committee of Universities Scotland and she also serves as the organisation's Lead Member for Gender-Based Violence.

Nolan was previously chair of the Scottish Higher Education Enhancement Committee, part of the Quality Assurance Agency for Higher Education, convenor of Universities Scotland, the representative body for third-level institutions in Scotland, and a trustee of Higher Education Statistics Agency and Glasgow International College - a partnership between the University of Glasgow and Kaplan International Pathways. She was a member of the World Small Animal Veterinary Association’s Global Pain Council

== Recognition ==
Nolan has received awards including the Pfizer Academic Award for Animal Health Research, the British Small Animal Veterinary Association's Amoroso Award and, with collaborators, the Universities Federation for Animal Welfare Companion Animal Award for contributions to animal welfare.

She is a Fellow of the Royal Society of Edinburgh and of the Royal Agricultural Societies, and an honorary life member of the Association for Veterinary Teachers & Research Workers.

In 2014 Nolan was awarded an honorary OBE for her contributions to science and in 2024 was awarded an honorary CBE for services to higher education.

Academic offices
Preceded by Dame Joan Stringer	Principal & Vice Chancellor of Edinburgh Napier University; 2013–2024	Succeeded by Sue Rigby
