= Gossip (unfinished film) =

Gossip is an unfinished British independent drama film directed by Don Boyd that collapsed early in its production and was never finished. It is the subject of an essay by Dan North in Sights Unseen: Unfinished British Films, edited by him, and is referenced by Stephen Fry, employed as a script rewriter for the film, in his book The Fry Chronicles: An Autobiography. About a quarter of the script was shot and it is extensively archived at the Bill Douglas Centre for the History of Cinema and Popular Culture at the University of Exeter.

== Plot ==
Stephen Fry characterises the film as

a film that would capture a new and horrible side to Thatcher's Britain: the recently confident, arrogant, vulgar, Sloaney world in which night-club narcissists, trust-fund trash and philistine druggie aristos cavorted with recently cherished icons of finance, fashion and celebrity.

The film tells the story of a gossip-columnist Clare who enjoys a privileged life on the fringes of high society. However she gets into trouble over an indiscreet story she writes and falls from favour. She is rescued by William, a Cambridge don.

== Cast ==
Clare was to be played by Anne Louise Lambert and William by Anthony Higgins, who had already starred opposite Lambert in The Draughtsman's Contract. Simon Callow and Gary Oldman were also cast. It was to be Oldman's screen debut though none of his scenes were shot.

== Script ==
The script went through several incarnations.

It began as a 1979 treatment by Frances Lynn entitled Frantic: A Story About a Gossip Columnist whose characters included a certain Romo Dolonski, a Polish film director out on bail for abducting a 12-year-old girl. This sharp and bitchy treatment formed the basis for subsequent scripts.

By then Boyd was working in America and engaged the Tolkin brothers, Michael Tolkin and Stephen Tolkin, to take the treatment over and provide a US-based script for Universal Studios. However Universal Studios found the script too 'arty and European' and pulled out, which left Boyd free to take the project elsewhere. By this time he had returned to the UK and decided to reset the script in London as it had begun, eventually hiring Fry to do the rewrite.

== Finance ==
At the Cannes Film Festival in May 1982, Boyd was introduced to Alan Shephard representing the Martini Foundation. This foundation, based in Liechtenstein and led by Raymond Lanciault, had allegedly sold up their vermouth interests and wanted to diversify into films.

Boyd struck a deal with the foundation in which the foundation would finance four of his films at $5 million each for a $600,000 introduction fee and a 50% share in the profits. The initial $5 million for Gossip was to be provided in the form of certificates of deposit at a mutually agreed Dutch bank.

The agreement was signed 6 July 1982, the day after Boyd received the final script from Fry.

== Production ==
A huge Andrew McAlpine designed night-club set was constructed at Twickenham Studios, financed by a third-party £100,000 loan while Boyd awaited the Martini money, and shooting began on 25 October 1982.

In the event the Martini money never arrived and the production was shut down on 14 November 1982.

== Aftermath ==
Most production members did not get paid, although the Tolkin brothers and Stephen Fry had been. At September 1983 liabilities stood at £1,162,000 and Boyd was effectively blackballed by the unions until these were cleared. Boyd did not make another film for three years as a result. Boyd's production company, Boyd's Co, went into receivership in 1991.

== See also ==
- The Line of Beauty, Alan Hollinghurst's award-winning 2004 fictional account of life amongst the privileged governing classes in the early Thatcher years.
