= Joan Stringer =

British academic and educationalist

Dame Joan Stringer
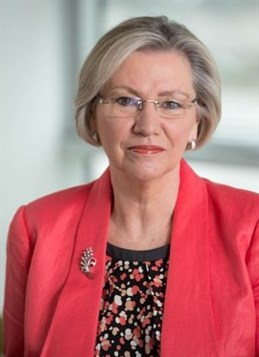

Former Principal & Vice-Chancellor of Edinburgh Napier University
- In office 2003–2013
- Chancellor: Viscount Younger of Leckie; Tim Waterstone
- Preceded by: John Mavor
- Succeeded by: Andrea Nolan

Personal details
- Born: Joan Kathleen Stringer; 12 May 1948 (age 78)
- Education: Keele University
- Profession: Public administrator
- Salary: £176,000 (2008)

Professor Dame Joan Kathleen Stringer, DBE, FRSE, FRSA (born 12 May 1948) is a British political scientist and former Principal and Vice-Chancellor of both Edinburgh Napier University and Queen Margaret University, Edinburgh.

== Biography ==
=== Education ===
Stringer attended Portland House High School, Stoke-on-Trent, and Stoke-on-Trent College of Art. She then went to Keele University, where she took a B.A. degree with joint honours in History and Politics and completed a Ph.D degree in Politics in 1986.

=== Career ===
From 1980 to 1988, she worked at Robert Gordon's Institute of Technology, Aberdeen as a lecturer in Public Administration, becoming in 1988 the Head of the School of Public Administration and Law, and served as Vice-Principal from 1991 to 1996.

In 1996, she was named Principal and Vice-Patron of Queen Margaret University College (QMUC) in Edinburgh. Her time at QMUC saw much expansion, and in 1998, the institution was awarded full degree-awarding powers, changing its name in 1999 to Queen Margaret University College (QMUC). Dame Joan laid the foundations for the University College to become Queen Margaret University, Edinburgh.

Stringer left Queen Margaret University College in 2003 to become Principal/Vice-Chancellor of Napier University.

In 2009, Stringer oversaw Napier University's change of name to Edinburgh Napier University in a bid to raise the institution's profile. In 2010–11, Professor Stringer oversaw a programme of redundancies at Edinburgh Napier University which resulted in 89 staff taking voluntary severance and a further anticipated 100 staff being dismissed on the grounds of compulsory redundancy.

Stringer has held a number of appointments outside of academia, including Chair of the Northern Ireland Equality Commission Working Group from 1998 to 1999, Lay Member of the Judicial Appointments Board for Scotland from 2002 to 2007, Senior Independent Director of the Institute of Directors, Member of the executive committee for the Scottish Council for Development and Industry, Chair of Education UK Scotland, Chair of Community Integrated Care, Convenor of the Scottish Council for Voluntary Organisations, and trustee of the David Hume Institute.

She is currently Chair of Capital Theatres in Edinburgh and a board member of Entrepreneurial Scotland.

== Honours ==
Stringer was appointed Commander of the Order of the British Empire (CBE) in 2001, and promoted to Dame Commander of the Order of the British Empire (DBE) in the 2009 Birthday Honours.

In 2001, she was elected a Fellow of The Royal Society of Edinburgh. She is also a Companion of the Chartered Institute of Management and a Fellow of the Royal Society of Arts.

Academic offices
Preceded by John Mavor	Principal of Edinburgh Napier University; 2003–2013	Succeeded by Andrea Nolan
