= Don Boyd =

Scottish filmmaker and novelist

- Born: Donald William Robertson Boyd; 11 August 1948 (age 78); Nairn, Scotland
- Education: London Film School
- Years active: 1974 – present
- Spouse: Hilary
- Children: Amanda, Clare, Kate
- Awards: Nominated Best Director Light Entertainment Series 1996, Nominated Grand Jury Prize Sundance 1991, Nominated Critics Award Deauville American Film Festival 1991, Nominated Joris Ivens Award for best documentary at Amsterdam International Documentary Film Festival 2004, Nominated Best Documentary British Independent Film Awards 2005

Donald William Robertson Boyd (born 11 August 1948) is a Scottish film director, producer, screenwriter and novelist. He was a Governor of the London Film School until 2016 and in 2017 was made an Honorary Professor in the College of Humanities at Exeter University.

== Biography ==
=== Early career ===
Boyd was brought up by his Scottish father and Russian mother in Hong Kong, Uganda and Kenya and educated at the noted Scottish public school Loretto School in Musselburgh, East Lothian. After leaving school in 1965 he trained as an accountant in Edinburgh before enrolling in the London Film School in 1968. He graduated in 1970 and began his career working for the BBC television series Tomorrow's World.

After two years directing commercials for the likes of Coca-Cola, Shell and Chrysler, he directed his first feature film, Intimate Reflections, which premiered at the London Film Festival in 1975. This was followed by East of Elephant Rock starring John Hurt, which also premiered at the London Film Festival but gathered mainly hostile reviews.

=== Boyd Co ===
In 1977 Boyd established his own production company, Boyd's Co. He raised £3 million to produce a slate of five films: Sweet William, Blue Suede Shoes, Hussy, Scum, and Derek Jarman's The Tempest.

He also produced Lindsay Anderson's Look Back in Anger and Julien Temple's The Great Rock 'n' Roll Swindle. During this time his company featured the work of such actors, writers, directors, producers, cinematographers and musicians as John Hurt, Ray Winstone, Dame Helen Mirren, Tilda Swinton, Stephen Fry, Michael Tolkin, Jeremy Thomas, Sarah Radclyffe, Bridget Fonda, Kathy Burke, The Edge, and The Sex Pistols.

In 1978 Boyd collaborated on and helped finance Ron Peck's and Paul Hallam's 1978 Nighthawks, described by Time Out as "Britain's first committed gay feature film", which attracted controversy in the UK at the time prompting Channel 4 to delay its broadcast until 1984.

Many of Boyd's films at this time, including Scum, Sweet William, and Derek Jarman's The Tempest attracted investors because their financing incorporated tax avoidance schemes devised by his business partner and close friend the tax accountant (also arts patron and benefactor) Roy Tucker. These schemes were funded by the Rossminster banking group. Rossminster attracted adverse media attention, especially from the noted Sunday Times financial journalist Lorana Sullivan, and was discussed in parliament.

At least £100 million in lost taxes is involved. According to Granada's World in Action programme, it could be as much as £1,000 million - equal to more than a penny on income tax for the rest of us.

In 1981 The House of Lords effectively ruled many of Tucker's schemes invalid leaving most of Rossminster's customers, including Boyd's investors, unable to garner any tax relief from his schemes after 1975. The total potential loss to the exchequer before Rossminster's activities were curtailed was eventually estimated at £362 million while the tax eventually returned (with interest) estimated at £500 million.

Tax avoidance schemes had been commonly used for years by celebrities in the entertainment world to protect their income and had been used for some years in the US to finance films. Tucker, whose interest at least initially was as much as a patron of the arts as devising tax schemes, and Boyd were among the first in the UK to provide them to finance films. The film critic and historian Alexander Walker commented that financing films in such ways became a common practice at the time but suggested that ultimately it was self-defeating because the government of the day might well have concluded that if the British film industry was so good at inventing financial self-help of this sort then it had no need of government assistance. Indeed, the 1985 Films Act, pushed through parliament by Norman Lamont, a fellow alumnus of Boyd's at Loretto School, despite all-party protest, dismantled all subsidies to the British film industry. Boyd severed his link with Tucker in 1984.

Boyd moved to Hollywood in the early 1980s for a two-year period, where he worked at both Paramount Pictures and Universal Studios and produced John Schlesinger's 1981 $24 million comedy Honky Tonk Freeway.

=== Return to UK ===
Boyd returned to the UK in 1982 and attempted to resume his directorial career with Gossip, which was to be a satire on celebrity life in the early Thatcher years based on an original treatment by Frances Lynn. The production ran into financial difficulties – Boyd was the victim of an elaborate fraud – and the film collapsed after just two weeks' shooting.

Dan North, a lecturer in film in the Department of English at Exeter University, has chronicled Gossip in Sights Unseen: Unfinished British Films edited by North. Stephen Fry was given his first job in film by Boyd as a script rewriter for Gossip and its story is recounted by him in The Fry Chronicles: An Autobiography. Fry is supportive of Boyd in his book

The film collapsed ... The upshot was that poor Don, one of the kindest and best of men, was effectively blacklisted and prevented from participating in film production for three years. Even that didn't end it, for once Don managed to start up again the unions insisted he continue to pay over what negligible producing fees he did earn. By 1992 he was financially wiped out ...

In 1987 Boyd produced the multi-directorial opera film Aria which featured segments by Robert Altman, Bruce Beresford, Bill Bryden, Jean-Luc Godard, Derek Jarman, Franc Roddam, Nicolas Roeg, Ken Russell, Charles Sturridge and Julien Temple. It was the closing night film, nominated for the Palme d'Or at the Cannes Film Festival in 1987, featured at numerous other major festivals including the Toronto International Film Festival and enjoyed multiple successful worldwide theatrical release.

After producing Derek Jarman's War Requiem, for the BBC in 1988, which was Laurence Olivier's last film, Boyd returned to his directorial career. He directed for ITV television the biopic Goldeneye starring Charles Dance as Ian Fleming, the creator of James Bond. He directed low-budget independent feature films such as Twenty-One, written by Zoë Heller and featuring Patsy Kensit as female lead; Kleptomania, co-scripted by Christa Lang, widow of Samuel Fuller; Lucia, based on Walter Scott's novel The Bride of Lammermoor and Donizetti's opera and featuring his daughter Amanda in the title role; and My Kingdom, a contemporary version of King Lear, which featured Richard Harris in his last leading role whose performance was nominated for a British Independent Film Award. Similarly Twenty-One earned Patsy Kensit a nomination for an Independent Spirit Award for Best Female Lead and was well received at its Sundance premiere earning Boyd direction a nomination. He further directed over twenty television documentaries including a BAFTA and Prix Italia nominated film featuring the comedian Ruby Wax in a documentary about Imelda Marcos; Andrew and Jeremy Get Married, a documentary film portrait of a commitment ceremony which had its world premiere at the Toronto International Film Festival in 2004 and was broadcast on the BBC as part of their Storyville documentary series; Full Frontal in Flip Flops, a documentary film portrait of naturism for ITV; and Donald and Luba: A Family Movie, an 'intimate family documentary' in which he and his 22-year-old filmmaker daughter Kate chronicled his parents' failed marriage (inter alia suggesting Boyd's father was a British spy during the Mau-Mau rebellion) and which was filmed on location in Harbin, Hong Kong, Jinja, Kyiv, London, Nairobi and Shanghai for the BBC.

The National Film Theatre presented a season of his films in 1982 culminating in a Guardian Lecture with the film critic Derek Malcolm.

In 2001 Boyd wrote an 8,000-word memoir for The Observer revealing that he had been sexually abused by a teacher while a student at Loretto School in the 1960s. The teacher was arrested and charged on the basis of other allegations that emerged. When the case came to court in Scotland the accused man's legal team pleaded that he was too ill to attend trial and the case was placed on file.

The University of Exeter awarded him an honorary doctorate in 2009. Previously he had been an honorary visiting professor in the College of Humanities between 2005 and 2015. Boyd had earlier donated his personal and business papers documenting his 30-year film career at that point to the university's Centre for Interdisciplinary Research (CIR). He has presented a series of In Conversation events at the CIR with prominent cultural figures such as Mike Leigh, Nicolas Roeg, and the Director-General of the BBC, Mark Thompson, lectures at least three times annually and was instrumental in the university's academic relationship with the London Film School. In 2018 he initiated a series of Creative Dialogues at Exeter University with celebrated figures in the cultural arena - the first two, conducted by Boyd, were in depth conversations with the film star Charles Dance and the former editor of Vogue Alexandra Shulman.

Boyd's internet venture, Hibrow, 'the world's first independent Internet platform for freshly created content curated and produced by established visual and performing arts', went 'live' on 20 December 2011. It has instigated, produced and published 'free to view' online over 150 hours of arts programming with work involving numerous organisations and luminaries in the arts arenas including the Royal Liverpool Philharmonic, the Washington National Gallery of Art, the Tate St Ives, the Traverse Theatre, the British Library, the Klin Tchaikovsky Museum, the Barbican Cinema, the ICA, World Book Night, the Folio Society, Marrakech Biennale, and NODA. Featured in over 400 professionally produced videos is the work and contributions of scores of internationally recognised authors, actors, conductors, artists, directors, dancers, choreographers, poets, singers, musicians and curators. Between 2009 and 2015, Boyd has been personally responsible for the curation, production and presentation of this work funded by private investors and by the Arts Council of England.HiBROW - Welcome to HiBROW

Alexander Walker referred to him as 'the Boyd Wonder' in his 1985 book National Heroes: British Cinema in the 70's and 80's while Boyd describes himself in the same text as 'a director-orientated audience-conscious film-marketing editor'.

== Writing ==
Boyd contributes to The Guardian newspaper, Time Out and The Observer where his personal opinions as an informed insider have been balanced publicly with his championship of indigenous British cinema.

In 2006, in his role as the guest editor of the Directors Guild of Great Britain's annual magazine Direct, he persuaded 22 film-makers including Stephen Frears, Hanif Kureishi, Terence Davies and Charles Dance to contribute articles and interviews to help consolidate the profile and public status of the unique pool of directorial talent in the United Kingdom.

In 2010 Boyd published his first novel, Margot's Secrets, a psychological thriller set in Barcelona about a therapist forced to confront her own adulterous secret following a series of violent ritualistic murders involving her clients. His wife Hilary, a granddaughter of the late Frederick Marquis, 1st Earl of Woolton, has also published fiction; her debut novel, Thursdays in the Park (2011), reached the top spot in the Amazon bestseller chart.

== Filmography ==
Directed

- Intimate Reflections (1975)
- East of Elephant Rock (1977)
- Gossip (1982 unfinished)
- Goldeneye (1989)
- Twenty-One (1991)
- Kleptomania (1993)
- Lucia (1998)
- My Kingdom (2001)
- Andrew and Jeremy Get Married (2004)

Produced

- The Four Seasons (1977)
- Anti-Clock (1979)
- Blue Suede Shoes (1979)
- Hussy (1979)
- Scum (1979)
- The Tempest (1979)
- Sweet William (1980)
- The Great Rock 'n' Roll Swindle (1980)
- Look Back in Anger (1980)
- Honky Tonk Freeway (1981)
- An Unsuitable Job for a Woman (1982)
- Scrubbers (1982)
- Captive (1985)
- Aria (1987)
- The Last of England (1987)
- War Requiem (1988)
- The Girl with Brains in Her Feet (1997)
