= East of Elephant Rock =

1977 British independent drama film by Don Boyd

- Directed by: Don Boyd
- Starring: John Hurt
- Release dates: 5 December 1976 (London Film Festival); 12 January 1978 (London)
- Country: United Kingdom
- Language: English
- Budget: £100,000

East of Elephant Rock is a 1977 British independent drama film directed by Don Boyd and starring John Hurt, Jeremy Kemp and Judi Bowker. It was Boyd's second feature film following Intimate Reflections (1975). Like William Somerset Maugham's 1927 play The Letter and two subsequent film adaptations, its narrative content depended on the 1911 Ethel Proudlock murder scandal in Kuala Lumpur, Malaysia, which became a cause célèbre scandalising British colonial society and which had been featured in a Sunday Observer article as recently as the year before.

Boyd, drawing in part on his own experience of growing up in an increasingly dysfunctional family in Kenya during the Mau Mau rebellion, wanted to tell a story about the decline of the Empire and the surrender of responsibility. In the event his project was for the most part ridiculed but the film did draw warm support from the film director Bryan Forbes.

== Plot ==
The film is set in Ceylon in 1948. The governor is assassinated, but the colonists continue to ignore the natives' discontent with British occupation. Plantation owner Robert Proudfoot exploits his native workers, while his spoiled wife Eve becomes progressively distant from her husband. Eventually Eve has an affair with Embassy secretary Nash but soon discovers that Nash already has a mistress: a native woman. In a fit of rage, Eve murders Nash. Robert comes to Eve's rescue and tries to get her lighter sentencing for the murder.

== Cast ==
- John Hurt as Nash
- Jeremy Kemp as Harry Rawlins
- Judi Bowker as Eve Proudfoot
- Christopher Cazenove as Robert Proudfoot
- Anton Rodgers as Mackintosh
- Tariq Yunus as Inti
- Vajira Cabraal as Sharmani
- Sam Poythress as Governor General
- Geoffrey Hale as Commissioner
- Upali Attanayaka as Rawlin's houseboy
- J. B. L. Gunasekera as Sharmani's uncle

== Production ==
The film is treated at length in Alexander Walker's book National Heroes: British Cinema in the 70's and 80's. The script was written by Richard Boyle, with input from fellow journalist, James Atherton. Filming took place during a four-week period in April and May 1976, on location in Sri Lanka, with a budget of just £100,000. Post production was undertaken in London and the film's score was composed by Peter Skellern.

== Release ==
The film was selected for the 1976 London Film Festival, screening in December. The programme notes pointed out:

All through the production there was a conscious stylistic discipline of creating a film to echo the moods and mannerisms of the heyday of big studios in the 1940s, and yet encompass a modern approach. This is not to say that it is not a genre movie; indeed much of its charm is derived from the fact that it is not easily categorized with other films being made today.

It took a year for Boyd to find a distributor and then secure a release, as it was an independent production - without any studio backing. Its first general screening was in January 1978, at the brand-new four-screen Classic 1-2-3-4 on Oxford Street in London.

== Reception ==
=== Critical ===
The film received an extraordinarily hostile UK press and there were suggestions that Boyd had 'ripped-off' William Wyler's classic film noir The Letter. Boyd responded, not implausibly, that he simply hadn't seen Wyler's film but he certainly knew of the Proudlock affair.

The Guardian declared it "falls down just about everywhere."

Philip French, writing in The Times, commented:

The writer-director Don Boyd embellished his tale with some political background .. with not the remotest understanding of colonial politics in the post world-war. Elephant Rock is badly lit, badly edited and badly acted. Typically in the course of a love scene on a railway platform, the station clock moves back half an hour.

while Time Out characterised it as a "depressingly redundant sample of British independent cinema".

Alexander Walker's view praised the film's often glorious mise en scène on a limited budget and especially valorises Jeremy Kemp's performance but agrees the story was ineptly handled.

Bryan Forbes came to the film's defence in a letter to The Times

At a time when the British film industry desperately needs sympathetic encouragement, it is sad that such a worthy endeavour by a young director ... should be greeted with such a distorted - and to those who know - unfair reception

later joking that his letter had cost him good reviews for his own films ever since. Alexander Walker in the Evening Standard stated

Whatever Don Boyd can’t do, he can involve you in a real sense of people and space; the small-timers of backwoods administration living it up in feudal style, clustering ever more tightly together at the cocktail parties for security. The present scenic glories and past mementoes of Empire in Ceylon give the film a perspiring sense of social authenticity.

== See also ==
- The Long Day Wanes: A Malayan Trilogy. Anthony Burgess' definitive fictional exploration of post-war colonial life in Malaya during the Malayan Emergency.
