= A Talent for Murder =

A Talent for Murder may refer to:

- A Talent for Murder (1983 film), a British mystery directed by Alvin Rakoff
- A Talent for Murder (2026 film), a thriller directed by Anton Corbijn
