= Sue Rigby =

British palaeontologist

Sue Rigby CBE FRSE
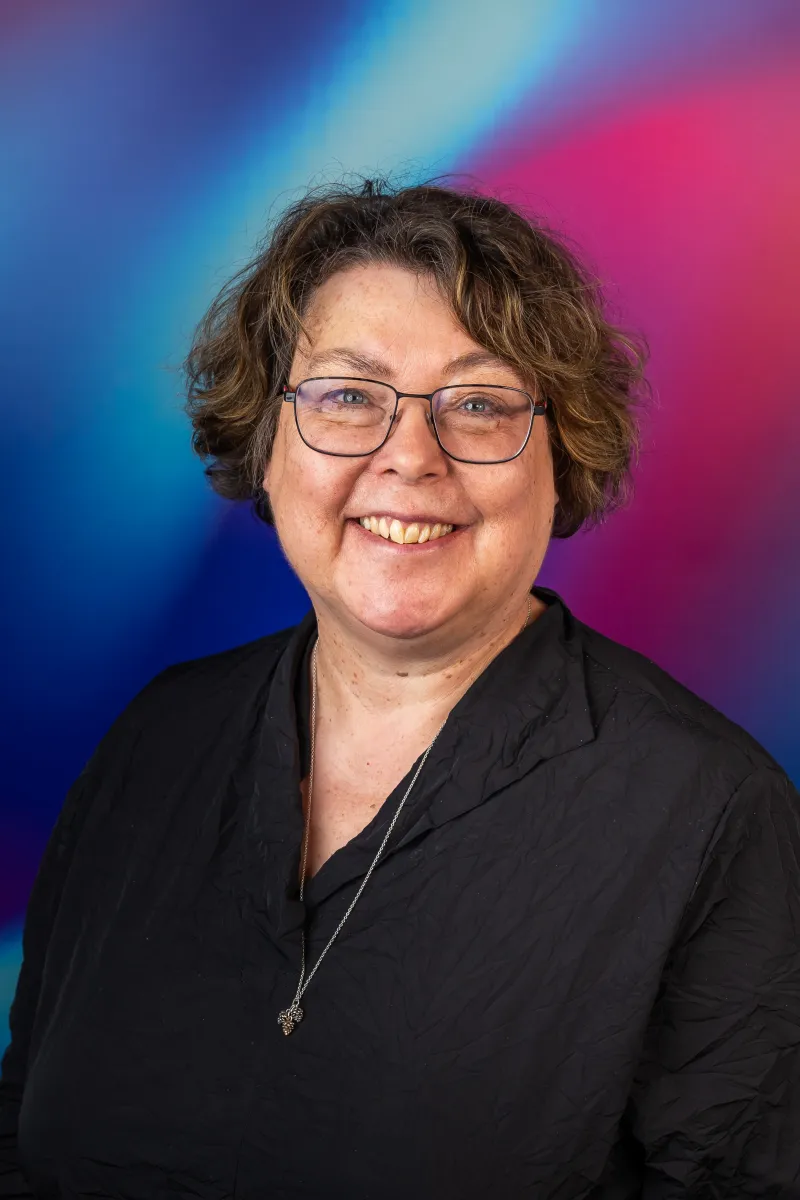

Principal & Vice Chancellor of Edinburgh Napier University
- Incumbent
- Assumed office 2025
- Chancellor: Will Whitehorn
- Preceded by: Andrea Nolan

Personal details
- Education: University of Oxford
- Profession: Paleontologist

Susan Rigby CBE FRSE is Professor of palaeontology and Principal and Vice Chancellor of Edinburgh Napier University. She was previously Vice-Chancellor of Bath Spa University. She is an HEA Principal Fellow and an Honorary Professor at the University of Edinburgh.

== Education ==
Rigby received her PhD from the University of Cambridge in 1990 for a doctorate on Graptoloid Form and Function. She received a BSc. from the University of Oxford in 1986.

== Career ==
Rigby was appointed Vice-Chancellor at Bath Spa University in January 2018, succeeding Professor Christina Slade. She received £209,597.50 per year for her salary. In addition she elected to receive payment in lieu of pension contributions of £39,572 per year. She could also be awarded a bonus of up to £19,200, dependent on performance. Before taking up this post she was Deputy Vice-Chancellor for Student Development at the University of Lincoln.

In July 2024, it was announced that Rigby would leave Bath on 31 December 2024 to take up the role of Principal and Vice-Chancellor at Edinburgh Napier University in January 2025, replacing Professor Andrea Nolan who was retiring.

Before moving in management in higher education, she had worked as a paleontologist at the universities of Cambridge, Leicester and Edinburgh. She was Assistant Principal and then Vice-Principal at the University of Edinburgh.

Rigby is a member of the Teaching Excellence and Student Outcomes Framework (TEF) Panel. She was elected co-convener of the Higher Education Academy's PVC Network in 2016.

She has contributed on an international level to the development of reward and recognition processes for staff in learning and teaching through Universitas 21, a global network of research universities, and she developed the first MOOC (massive open online course) to be shared by students in the U21 universities.

Rigby's first employment was writing about exhibitions at the Geological Museum, South Kensington. With C. V. Milson, she co-authored the book Fossils At A Glance (Wiley-Blackwell, 2009) which is the standard textbook for introductory paleontology and has informed the design of the A-level curriculum. It has been translated into four languages.

Rigby's heroine is the paleontologist Gertrude Elles.

She was elected a Fellow of the Royal Society of Edinburgh in 2022.

== Publications ==
Milsom, C. V. and Rigby, S., (2009) Fossils At A Glance. 2nd ed. Wiley-Blackwell. ISBN 9781405193368

Harper, E. M. and Rigby, S., (2005) 'Palaeoecology' in Selley, R.C, Cocks, R.M and Plimer, I.R, eds. Encyclopedia of geology (Elsevier), pp. 140–7. ISBN 9780123693969

Academic offices
Preceded by Andrea Nolan	Principal and Vice Chancellor of Edinburgh Napier University; 2025-present	Succeeded by Incumbent
