= Hilary Boyd =

British novelist

- Born: 23 June 1949 (age 77); Prestatyn, North Wales
- Occupation: novelist
- Spouse: Don Boyd (1973 – present)
- Writing career
- Period: 2011 – present
- Genre: Romance novel
- Notable work: Thursdays in the Park
- Website: www.hilaryboyd.com

Hilary Boyd (born 23 June 1949) is a Welsh-born British novelist. Her first novel, Thursdays in the Park, became an unexpected best seller. Her work, often dealing with the erotic lives of older people, has given rise to a new literary genre, described by the Observer newspaper, as 'gran-lit'.

== Early life ==
Boyd was born and spent the first six months of her life in Prestatyn, North Wales, where her father, an army major, was stationed after the war. She was later educated in London, then at the boarding school Roedean. She trained as a nurse at Great Ormond Street Hospital, London, and subsequently as a marriage guidance counsellor with Relate before reading English Literature at London University in her late 30s.

== Non-fiction ==
After college, Boyd became a health journalist, writing about depression, step-parenting and pregnancy. She began writing fiction as a hobby whilst raising three children and working at various day jobs including running a cancer charity, Survive Cancer, working for an engineering company, and an online vitamin site.

== First novel ==
Boyd wrote, and publishers rejected, five novels before her first published novel, Thursdays in the Park, appeared from Quercus Books in 2011. Boyd was 62. In an interview for ITV News, Boyd said of her years of rejection: 'Writing was always my hobby so I would cry a little, get over it, and start again, and I would have done that until I died'. Publishing fiction in later in life, Boyd was inevitably compared with late bloomer writer Mary Wesley, whose first novel appeared when Wesley was 71.

Thursdays in the Park had modest success in print form, although it was noted at the time that the investigation of the romantic lives of people in their 60s was unusual in popular literature. It was the e-book form of Thursdays that turned the work into an unexpected best-seller, topping the Amazon best-seller list for six weeks and selling, ultimately more than 650,000 copies in paper and e-book form.

Comparisons were made between Thursdays in the Park and the BDSM phenomenon Fifty Shades of Grey. The Times described Boyd as "putting the sex back into sexagenarian"; and the phrase "Fifty Shades of Grey for the over 60s" was taken up by a number of newspapers including The Mail and The Independent.

Underneath the hyperbole, Boyd's novel had identified and given voice to altered expectations amongst older people. By giving life to characters in their 60s with clearly articulated sexual desires, she undermined the idea that sex is something that fades with time, and that older people are no longer sexual beings.

== Themes ==
Boyd can be seen to adopt a broadly feminist position in her works, demonstrating a particular interest in the influence older women have over their own lives as they age. A recurring thematic thread investigates the twinned ideas of invisibility and freedom. She is intrigued by the notion of the family unit as the bedrock on which all other human interactions are built, stating 'It is in the family that we learn – or don't learn – to relate effectively to others'.

== Novels ==
- Thursdays in the Park Quercus Publishing 2011
- Tangled Lives Quercus Publishing 2013
- When You Walked Back into My Life Quercus Publishing 2013
- Solstice co-written with Barbara Roddam, Unbound digital publisher 2013
- A most desirable marriage Quercus Publishing 2014

== Non-fiction books ==
- The Step-Parent's Survival Guide Cassells 1998
- Banishing the Blues Mitchell-Beazley 2000
- Working Women's Pregnancy Mitchell-Beazley 2001
- The Joy of Sex updated sections, Mitchell-Beazley 2002
- Boosting Your Energy Mitchell-Beazley 2004
- The Natural Way to Beat Depression co-writer with Prof Basant Puri Hodder Mobius 2004
- Blooming Beautiful co-writer with Melanie Sykes Penguin 2006
