= John Mavor =

Pioneer in signal processing

John Mavor was a pioneer in the design of MOS transistors and Charge-Coupled Devices (CCDs) for signal processing. During his career as an educator and researcher at the University of Edinburgh he was appointed Professor before becoming Dean of the Faculty of Science and Engineering. He was subsequently appointed as Principal and Vice-Chancellor at Edinburgh Napier University.

== Education ==
Born in Ayrshire, Scotland, John Mavor was educated in London. He gained a BSc (Hons) from City University and PhD and DSc (Eng) degrees also from London and, later, Honorary DSc (Eng) awards from both City and Greenwich Universities.

== Career ==
Following his PhD in Metal-Oxide Silicon (MOS) transistors, in 1968 he joined Texas Instruments before moving to the Glenrothes subsidiary of Hughes Aircraft Company, a key centre for microelectronics in Silicon Glen.

He was appointed lecturer at The University of Edinburgh by Ewart Farvis in 1971 where he held two consecutive chairs: the Lothian Chair of Microelectronics (1980–85); and the Chair of Electrical Engineering (1986-1994). He became Dean of Science and Engineering in 1989 after being Head of Electrical Engineering from 1984. Although a prominent academic, he consulted with many companies including Plessey, ICI, Thorn-EMI and General Instruments.

Mavor’s most active research was in MOS transistors and Charge-Coupled Devices (CCDs) for signal processing, in conjunction with a number of research students, notably: Don MacLennan, Neil Weste, Peter Denyer, Colin Cowan, Colin Carruthers and Neil Petrie. Together with John Arthur from Wolfson Microelectronics they designed analogue miniature monolithic correlators with up to 256-point capability. These were later extended into CCD adaptive filters. He also researched on the companion switched capacitor techniques. He held several contracts with the MOD at RSRE Malvern (radar) and AUWE Portland (sonar). In 1980 he initiated collaborative research with Philips Components Ltd. (Mullard), Southampton, on MOS/CCD signal processing for infrared sensors. These focal plane arrays exceeded 64x64 pixels and were employed in commercial and military systems. His research cooperation led to the International Charge-Coupled Devices Conference Series, co-organised by Isaac Lagnado of NOSC, San Diego and Dennis D. Buss of Texas Instruments.

From 1994-2002 Mavor was appointed Principal and Vice-Chancellor of Edinburgh Napier University. Here he formed ‘research pillars’ to strengthen interdisciplinarity, e.g. the Transport Research Institute, coordinating activity in this area across the university. He developed each of the campuses: at Craighouse with a new teaching building; at Craiglockhart with a new Business School lecture theatre; and at Merchiston a 500-seat student computing facility. In 1995 the Scottish Office decided to place the Health Board Colleges into the higher education sector with Mavor securing the largest Napier contract to create a new Faculty, and form the biggest health studies unit in Scotland. Mavor was Principal in 2000 when the university was accused, by student leaders, of allowing the institution to slide into crisis.

After Mavor retired he pursued a post-graduate degree at The University of Edinburgh in Social & Economic History. This resulted in an MPhil on Walter Montgomerie Neilson, who was a Victorian businessman and, arguably, the father of steam locomotive production in Glasgow who founded the North British Locomotive Company Ltd.

== Recognition ==
He achieved several distinctions: Fellow of the IEEE; Chartered Engineer and Chartered Physicist; Fellow of both the Institution of Electrical Engineers and the Institute of Physics. In 1989 he was elected Fellow of the Royal Society of Edinburgh becoming Vice-President for Physical Sciences, and in 1994 a Fellow of the Royal Academy of Engineering.
