= Flo Fox =

American street photographer (1945–2025)

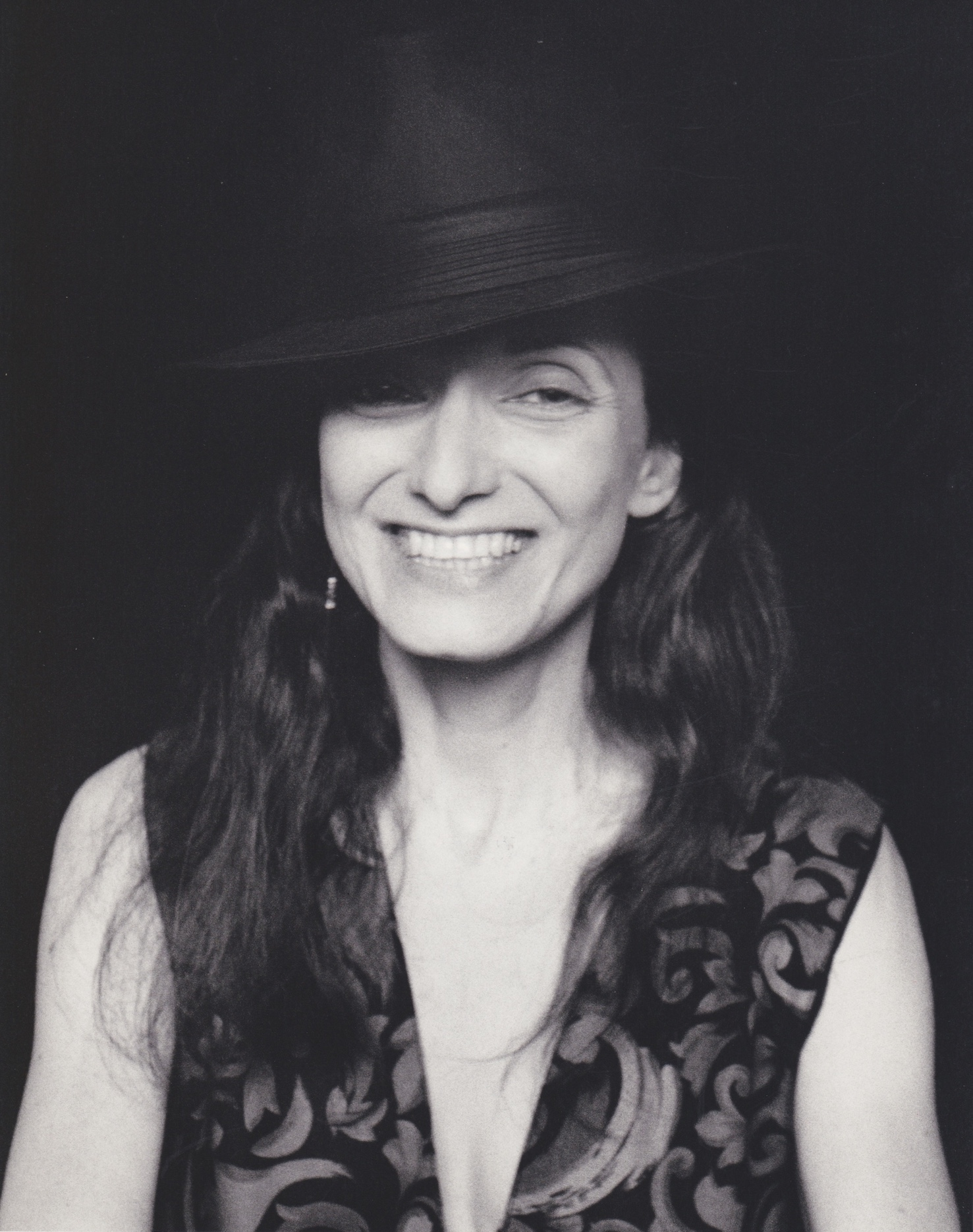
- Fox in 1994, photo by Gigi Stoll
- Born: Florence Blossom Fox; September 26, 1945; Woodside, New York, U.S.
- Died: March 2, 2025 (aged 79); New York City, U.S.
- Occupations: Photographer; disability advocate; photography instructor
- Years active: 1970s–2025
- Known for: Street photography despite blindness and paralysis

Florence Blossom Fox (/floʊ fɒks/; September 26, 1945 – March 2, 2025) was an American street photographer. Diagnosed with multiple sclerosis at age 30, Fox carried on working as a photographer despite being completely paralyzed, having attendants, friends, and strangers take photos for her with an autofocus camera.

== Life and career ==
Fox was born in Woodside, New York. Throughout her career and with an archive of over 130,000 works, she photographed various subjects in New York City. Her work was in the permanent collection of the Brooklyn Museum and the Smithsonian. Fox's 'zine, Ironic Reality, was published by Dashwood Books in 2023. Her images have appeared in Life Magazine, New York Magazine and been exhibited in Paris, London, Barcelona and Mexico. Fox had also been interviewed on several talks shows, including Regis and Kathy Lee and Tom Snyder. Photographer Richard Young credited Fox with "giving [him] the confidence to pick up the camera".

During the early 1980s, she hosted her own show called the Foto Flo Show, interviewing other photographers such as Ruth Orkin and Ralph Gibson on their work and their creative methods. Riley Hooper made a short documentary film, Flo, which was featured in The New York Times in 2013.

Fox was a disability advocate and had taught photography class for the blind and visually impaired students at the Lighthouse for the Blind. Despite blindness, multiple sclerosis, and lung cancer, she continued to photograph the streets of New York City. Fox also appeared briefly as herself in the 2010 documentary, Joan Rivers: A Piece of Work.

Fox died at her home in New York City on March 2, 2025, at the age of 79.
