= Tariq Yunus =

Indian actor (194?–1994)

- Born: 16 October 1946; Karachi, India
- Died: 26 August 1994 (aged 47); Bombay, India
- Years active: 1969–1994
- Spouse: Sultana Abdullah (m. 1989, divorced)

Tariq Yunus (16 October 1946 (Note: This date of birth is most commonly given yet some sources like his obituary in The Guardian list it as 23 March 1940.) – 26 August 1994) was an Indian actor known for his role as chef Alaudin in television sitcom Tandoori Nights.

== Early life ==
Born in India (his brother being the politician Kunwar Khalid Yunus) but moved to Pakistan following partition, Yunus gained his first acting part in a children's play for local radio and began to work regularly for this media. He joined a theatrical group run by the Arts Council while at college studying Geology.

Two months before he was due to take his Geology Degree exams in 1962, Yunus headed to Britain in the hope of making his fortune. Arriving with only £10 in his pocket, he had to get a job helping a milkman. Living on his wits, he became a professional card player.

== Career ==
Without any proper training, Yunus began to work as an extra which led to having parts in The Wednesday Play, Crown Court, Sykes, Father Brown, It Ain't Half Hot Mum, Angels, the Doctor Who classic The Robots of Death, The Professionals, Strangers, Terry and June, The Dick Emery Show, Hammer House of Horror, Shoestring, Minder, The Bill, Around the World in 80 Days, Inspector Morse and House of Cards. Along the way, he achieved bigger and more regular roles such as playing a con-man in A Passage to India (for Play for Today), Jashir Singh Mahail in Birmingham-based drama series Gangsters, Dr. Khan in We'll Think of Something and Harry Patel in News at Twelve.

Film roles included East of Elephant Rock, Rosie Dixon – Night Nurse, The Golden Lady, Ashanti, Who Dares Wins, A Talent for Murder, The Fourth Protocol, Partition, The Deceivers and Scandal.

The 1988 Screen Two play Lucky Sunil was inspired by Tariq's tales when he first came to London, with the actor co-starring in the production.

Later in life, Yunus concentrated more on writing and developing his own projects, which led him back to his native India but still continued to act. For many years, he was a founder member of Equity's Afro-Asian Committee, promoting the careers of actors from other ethnic minorities.

== Death ==
While directing a play at Bombay's Prithvi Theatre in 1994, Yunus died from a heart attack whilst suffering with typhoid in the house of his friend Jalal Agha, the son of Bollywood actor Agha (however, his obituary claims he died in hospital) . He is buried in Karachi.

== Filmography ==
Year	Title	Role	Notes
1970	Figures in a Landscape	Soldier #5	
1978	East of Elephant Rock	Inti	
1978	Rosie Dixon – Night Nurse	Black Doctor	
1979	Ashanti	Faid	
1979	The Golden Lady	Vishanya	
1982	Who Dares Wins	Terrorist #1	
1984	A Talent for Murder	Rashi	TV movie
1987	The Fourth Protocol	Immigration Officer	
1987	Partition		
1988	The Deceivers	Feringea	
1989	Scandal	Ayub Khan	
1993	Bedardi	Mehta	
1994	Bollywood		(final film role)
