= Hildegarde Neil =

English actress (1939–2023)

- Born: 20 May 1939; Cape Town, South Africa
- Died: 19 September 2023 (aged 84)
- Other name: Hildegard Blessed
- Occupation: Actress
- Spouse: Brian Blessed (m. 1978)
- Children: 1

Hildegard Hope Zimmermann (20 May 1939 – 19 September 2023), also credited as Hildegard Neil, was an English actress.

== Career ==
Born in South Africa, she came to England in 1961 and went to RADA for two years. Neil first appeared on television in a BBC schools' television production of Julius Caesar in 1963 and after that appeared mostly as a guest artiste in a variety of television series over the next 40 years. She has also appeared in several films and on stage, both in the West End and touring.

== Personal life ==
Neil was married to actor Brian Blessed and had a daughter with him, Rosalind, who is also an actress and represented by the same agent as her mother. On 23 May 2009, Neil appeared with her husband on the ITV entertainment show, All Star Mr & Mrs, on which it was established that she was a keen Liverpool F.C. supporter.

Hildegarde Neil died of cancer on 19 September 2023, at the age of 84.

== Stage appearances ==
- Neil was a member of the company of the young Liverpool Everyman theatre from 1965, appearing amongst other productions in As You Like It, Moliere's The Hypochondriac and Hedda Gabler by Ibsen.
- Neil spent a season at the Royal Shakespeare Company in 1969–70, playing a variety of roles.
- Neil played Lady Macbeth in Ewan Hooper's production of Macbeth at the Greenwich Theatre, which opened on 18 February 1971.
- Neil directed Roan School for Girls' production of Much Ado about Nothing in 1971 and As You Like It in 1972.

== Filmography ==
=== Film ===
Year	Title	Role	Notes
1970	The Man Who Haunted Himself	Eve Pelham	
1972	Antony and Cleopatra	Cleopatra	
1973	A Touch of Class	Gloria Blackburn	
1973	England Made Me	Kate Farrant	
1978	The Legacy	Barbara Kirstenburg	
1980	The Mirror Crack'd	Lady Foxcroft	"Murder at Midnight"
1994	Seaview Knights	The Psychiatrist	
1996	The Bruce	Queen Eleanor	
1997	Macbeth	1st Witch	
1999	King Lear	The Fool	
2005	Upstaged	Aunt Mary	
2009	Mr. Bojagi	The Woman	Short
2016	Leni. Leni.	Leni Riefenstahl	Short
20??	Previous Vengeance	Beatka	Announced

=== Television ===
Year	Title	Role	Notes
1963	Julius Caesar	Calpurnia	TV miniseries
1964	No Hiding Place	Ann	"Aftertaste"
1968	Dixon of Dock Green	Jean Holden	"The Prospective Candidate"
1968	Resurrection	Mariette	TV miniseries
1969	Imperial Palace	Gracie Savott	"Arrivals", "Departures"
1969	The Mind of Mr. J.G. Reeder	Marylou Plessy	"The Green Mamba"
1969	The Expert	Dorothy Hamilton	"A Family Affair"
1969	W. Somerset Maugham	Lady Kastellan	"A Casual Affair"
1969	ITV Playhouse	Marion	"Double Agent"
1970	Mystery and Imagination	The Woman in Black	"The Suicide Club"
1970	Doomwatch	Dr. Stella Robson	"Project Sahara"
1970	Codename	Zeta Baker	"Come Home to Paradise"
1970	Ace of Wands	Madame Midnight	"One and One and One Are Four: Parts 2 & 3"
1970	The Adventures of Don Quick	Mrs. Arborel	"The Higher the Fewer"
1970	The Main Chance	Ursula Findon	"Settlement Day"
1970	Happily Ever After	Mary Wilshaw	"Don't Walk Away"
1970	Put Out More Flags	Angela Lyne	TV film
1970	Man at the Top	Liz Gilbert	"It's All Perfectly True"
1971	Jason King	Lyra Delon	"Flamingos Only Fly on Tuesdays"
1972	Six Faces	Helen Barlow	"Commonwealth of Malignants", "Around the Child"
1973	Play for Today	Diana	"Access to the Children"
1973	The Protectors	Irena Gayevska	"The Last Frontier"
1974	Orson Welles Great Mysteries	The Lady	"Compliments of the Season"
1974	Boy Dominic	Emma Bulman	TV series
1974	The Early Life of Stephen Hind	Colette Hyde	TV miniseries
1975	Whodunnit?	Audrey Baxter	"Final Drive"
1976	Couples	Diana Lawson	"1.52", "1.53", "1.54"
1977	Crown Court	Virginia Matheson	"Such a Charming Man: Part 1"
1977	Space: 1999	Elizia	"Devil's Planet"
1977	Van der Valk	Else Rokin	"Accidental"
1978	The Professionals	Sara	"Close Quarters"
1979	ITV Playhouse	Philippa	"Saint Vitus' Dance"
1981	A Spy at Evening	Virginia	TV miniseries
1981	Diamonds	Margaret Coleman	Main role
1984	A Talent for Murder	Sheila McClain	TV film
2007	Hotel Babylon	Marchioness of Telford	"2.3"
2007	Doctors	Nellie Shamus	"Flights of Fantasy"
2009	Doctors	Shelia Bardock	"Vera Pym"
2010	Above Suspicion	Florence Pennel	"The Red Dahlia: Part 1"
2012	Doctors	Rosie Bryer	"The Well Spoken Man"
