= Chartered Institute of Logistics and Transport in the UK =

UK professional membership organisation

The Chartered Institute of Logistics and Transport (UK)
- Type: Professional membership organisation
- Industry: Transport and Logistics
- Founded: Charity
- Headquarters: Corby and London
- Revenue: 4,682,000 pound sterling (2016)
- Number of employees: 71 (2016, 2017)
- Website: ciltuk.org.uk

The Chartered Institute of Logistics and Transport in the UK is the membership organisation for United Kingdom professionals involved in the movement of goods and people, and their associated supply chains. It is a National Council of CILT International.

First established in 1919 as the Chartered Institute of Transport, the Institute is a registered charity.

== Overview ==
The institute provides services through nine professional sectors: Active Travel and Planning, Aviation, Bus and Coach, Freight Forwarding, Logistics and Supply Chain, Operations Management, Ports Maritime and Waterways, Rail and Transport Planning. These provide specialist activities and multi-sector engagement through their associated forums and policy groups. The Institute currently has over 25 specialist forums.

== History ==
The Institute was formed in London in 1919 and was granted its Royal Charter in 1926.

The growth of its overseas sections led to a restructuring of the Institute in 1994, under which 10 national councils were established in various parts of the world. The Institute operates as a co-ordinating body and custodian of the Royal Charter. The Institute was formed as the United Kingdom National Council and is the largest national council with over half the total worldwide membership of CILT. In 1999 the former Institute of Logistics and Transport (ILT) took over from CIT UK as the UK National Council.

In April 2004 the Institute's membership voted in favour of ILT adopting the word 'Chartered' into its title. In May 2004 the Institute officially became 'The Chartered Institute of Logistics and Transport in the UK'. All National Councils are effectively 'chartered' through their membership of CILT and are represented on its governing Council. CILT continues to hold the Royal Charter under the authority of the (UK) Privy Council. Subject to certain qualifications, individual members of any National Council hold chartered status under the authority of this Royal Charter.

=== Board representation ===
President

The CILT President serves a one-year term beginning at the end of May. The President is responsible for leading and promoting the policies and interests of the logistics, transport and operations professions in the public arena. The President for 2023 is Leon Daniels OBE FCILT.

Previous presidents include:

- 2021 and 2022 Steve Gooding
- 2019 and 2020 Paul Sainthouse FCILT
- 2017 and 2018 Robin Proctor FCILT
- 2016 Will Whitehorn FCILT
- 2015 Beverley Bell CBE FCILT
- 2014 Jim Spittle FCILT
- 2013 Jim Steer FCILT
- 2012 Graham Inglis FCILT
- 2011 Sir Peter Hendy CBE FCILT
- 2010 Sir Moir Lockhead OBE DHC FCILT
- 2009 Graeme McFaull BA, ACMA, FCILT
- 2008 Richard Brown CBE FCILT

=== Vice-Presidents ===
The Institute's Vice-Presidents include parliamentarians, policy officials, academics and leaders from the public transport, freight and supply chain sectors.

=== Chair ===
The CILT Chair actively engages with members and helps develop CILT, to ensure all members are represented at both board and executive level. The chair has ultimate governance responsibility for the Institute and is elected for a maximum of four years. The current Chair is Anna-Jane Hunter FCILT.

=== Chief Executive ===
Helen Hardy FCILT was appointed Chief Executive Officer of the Institute in January 2026, following a successful seven‑month period as Interim CEO from June 2025 to January 2026. She had previously served as CILT(UK)’s Director of Partnerships and Marketing, after earlier serving as Director of Membership & Engagement. Hardy was preceded as Chief Executive by Paul Adams, who served from December 2023 until June 2025, Sharon Kindleysides from 2022 to 2023 and Kevin Richardson from 2015 to 2022

== Membership and chartered membership ==
=== Individual membership ===
Membership at entry level is available to all that have an interest in the profession. For higher grades, each application is assessed. The Institute offers five grades of membership: the non-assessed grades are affiliate and student, whilst the assessed grades include Member, Chartered Member and Chartered Fellow.

=== Corporate membership ===
Corporate members include 3PL/hauliers, bus and coach, manufacturers, retailers, suppliers, multi-modal, public authorities, and academic partners. Corporate Members are awarded one of five grades ranging from Bronze to Platinum +.

== Awarding organisation ==
CILT (UK) is an awarding organisation, accredited and regulated by Ofqual (England), Qualifications Wales and CCEA (Northern Ireland) to offer regulated qualifications in logistics and transport. Organisations can apply to become a recognised or they can partner existing CILT (UK) training centres. The Institute offers a suite of regulated qualifications that cover the nine main professional sectors and meet the regulatory requirements for the design, delivery, assessment and award of units and qualifications.

== Professional development ==
The Institute supports career advancement through continuing professional development, education, qualifications, networking, mentoring and training.

There are four delivery options available for training and qualifications:

- in-company training
- public courses
- distance learning
- online learning

== Knowledge Centre ==
The Institute's Knowledge Centre provides members with access to information in all areas of logistics, transport and the supply chain.

It comprises:

- Business Intelligence Service – offering access to market and business data, research databases and
- Information Service – providing members with assistance from a team of researchers
- John Williams Library – members can borrow books and journal articles via the online library catalogue, or visit the library in Corby, Northamptonshire

== Networking and events ==
=== National Events ===
CILT (UK)'s national events are held by, or in association with, the institute on a local or national level. They include an Annual Conference, Logistics Research Network Conference, President's Inauguration Lunch, Fellows' Lunch and The Annual Awards for Excellence.

=== Annual Conference & Awards for Excellence ===
The CILT Annual Conference takes place in September of each year.

=== Logistics Research Network Conference (LRN) ===
The LRN Conference is one of the European forums for the presentation of research results, current practice and new ideas in supply chain management, logistics and transport. Papers are invited from academics, researchers and practitioners working in the field of logistics, transportation and supply chain management. The annual three-day conference is hosted by a UK university every year in September.

=== Annual Lunch ===
The Annual Lunch takes place annually in December. The Institute's President delivers a 'state of the nation' address describing briefly CILT's position in relation to stated objectives, and summarises CILT's performance year to date.

== Logistics & Transport Focus magazine ==
Logistics & Transport Focus is the membership magazine of The Institute. The publication features articles from academics and industry experts covering all aspects of logistics and transport.
