= Frances Lynn =

English journalist and author

- Born: St. Mary's Hospital, Paddington, London, England
- Education: Malvern Girls' College
- Notable credit: Ritz Newspaper

Frances Lynn is an English journalist and author.

== Biography ==
Lynn was born in St. Mary's Hospital, Paddington in London, and was educated at Malvern Girls' College.

In 1977, Lynn started her journalistic career when she became the film editor and gossip columnist for the now defunct Ritz Newspaper, published by David Bailey. Interview subjects included Frank Zappa. She also wrote the initial treatment, entitled Frantic: A Story About a Gossip Columnist, whose characters included a certain Romo Dolonski, a Polish film director out on bail for abducting a 12-year-old girl, for Don Boyd's abortive 1982 film Gossip.

During the 1990s, Lynn contributed stories (seven Future Shocks and one Dragon Tales) to 2000 AD.

In 2006, her two novels, Crushed and Frantic, were both published by Eiworth Publishing.

In 2010, Willing To Die For It, her biography of Dr Sammy Lee, was published by Murray Print.
