= European Centre of Technology =

Coordinates: 55°54′33″N 3°19′12″W

- Established: 1975 with Centro Studi Galileo and European Energy Centre
- Location: London, United Kingdom Edinburgh, Scotland, United Kingdom
- Website: theECT.org

The European Centre of Technology (ECT) Institute is a Professional Body created in 1975 and its focus is engineering, marketing, finance education, and upskilling in order to create a workforce capable of promoting and supporting engineering topics including energy, efficiency and renewable energy. The ECT is also the first Renewable Energy Institute in Europe and in the Western Hemisphere.

The European Centre of Technology (ECT), along with the European Energy Centre (EEC) work with the United Nations Environment Programme (UNEP) the Intergovernmental International Institute of Refrigeration and Centro Studi Galileo, along with major Universities such as Edinburgh Napier University and Heriot-Watt University in promoting marketing and financial topics to engineers across the United Kingdom and Europe in general.

The European Centre of Technology (ECT) is also active European-wide in upskilling Energy Engineers with conferences in engineering, renewable energy, marketing and finance, see the 14th European Conference at Heriot-Watt University, Edinburgh.

The training activities of the European Centre of Technology (ECT) and Centro Studi Galileo (CSG) are also welcomed and shared through their partners.

The European Centre of Technology (ECT) is also active in India through the European Energy Centre (EEC) with training courses and conferences with its Indian Partner TERRE Policy Centre.

== Main activities of the organisation ==
- European conferences organised with the UN (UNEP) on the latest technologies in renewable energy
- Publications with the United Nations Environment Programme
- Promotion of best practices in renewable energy through training technicians and personnel
- Launching the Green New Deal in Europe and India
