= Centre for Timber Engineering =

The Centre for Timber Engineering (CTE) a research and education unit within the Forest Products Research Institute that is part of Edinburgh Napier University.

== Description ==
The Centre for Timber Engineering (CTE) is part of Edinburgh Napier University, one of the UK's post 1992 universities with an emphasis on practical research and working with industry. CTE is a research and education unit within the Forest Products Research Institute. It is the only centre of its kind within the United Kingdom, providing research, consultancy, information, education, and training related to timber in construction. Its activity ranges from fundamental research into timber's performance as an engineering material, right through to commercial testing and partnership working with industry on innovation and technology transfer projects.

== History ==
CTE was established in January 2002 following the result of a feasibility study carried out by the Scottish Forest Industries Cluster: a partnership between Forest Industries Development Council (now part of ConFor) and Scottish Enterprise.
