= Richard Young (photographer) =

English photographer (born 1947)

- Born: 1947 (age 78–79); London, England
- Occupation: Photographer
- Known for: Celebrity and society photographer since the 1970s
- Spouse: Susan Young
- Children: 3

Richard Young is an English society and celebrity photographer. His photography career started in 1974, and since then, he has photographed many prominent people, including Diana, Princess of Wales, Elizabeth Taylor, and Mick Jagger.

== Early life ==
Young grew up in North London, where he regularly assisted his father who ran a stall at Berwick Street Market. He attended the defunct William Wordsworth Secondary School, from where he was expelled with his contemporary school friend Marc Bolan when they were both 15. He worked in a boutique in King's Road where he served singer songwriter, Leonard Cohen In 1968, he went to Paris where he spent nine months working with advertising and fashion photographer, John Bishop. In the early 1970s, he moved to New York City where he worked at Electric Lady Studios and his girlfriend was photographer Flo Fox. He returned to London in the spring of 1974 and worked at a bookshop on Regent Street.

== Career ==
In 1974, Young's career in photography began when he was asked to take pictures for a book written by John Cowper Powys. Later that year, he was invited to photograph philanthropist John Paul Getty III as he went around London. These pictures earned him a job as a freelance photographer at the Evening Standard. He then worked with gossip magazine, Ritz Magazine, from 1976 to 1983, where he was given free rein to publish whatever pictures he wanted. Among Young's early photographs is a photograph taken of Keith Moon dining with Paul McCartney, hours before Moon died. Another is a photograph taken of Elizabeth Taylor kissing Richard Burton at his 50th birthday party at the Dorchester.

As of 2010, Young had worked with the photographic agency Rex Features for three decades. He and his wife, Susan Young, owned their own gallery, the Richard Young Gallery in Kensington. His work as well as those by other photographers is displayed at the gallery.

His portfolio includes Diana, Princess of Wales, Joan Collins, Elizabeth II, Kate Moss, Andy Warhol, Bob Marley, Stevie Wonder, Marvin Gaye, Jennifer Aniston, and Mick Jagger. Young has also photographed important political and cultural events, including United States troops in Iraq and Fidel Castro in Cuba. He has also visited orphanages in Romania with Michael Jackson and photographed the 46664 benefit for Nelson Mandela.

== Recognition and awards ==
In 2006, The Times named him as "one of the most important photographers of the 20th century".

In May and June 2012, Young's career was the subject of the documentary series Celebrity Exposed: The Photography of Richard Young, shown on Sky Arts. The four episodes of Celebrity Exposed featured exclusive interviews with a host of celebrity royalty including Kate Moss, Sir Elton John, Vivienne Westwood, Steven Berkoff, Tracey Emin, and many more.

In July 2012, Young was presented the Ischia Art Award at the Ischia Global Film & Music Festival in Italy while concurrently exhibiting 40 years' worth of his photographs of Elizabeth Taylor at the Colombaia Museum during the festival.

In March 2013, Champagne Bureau UK crowned Young with its first-ever Le Prix Champagne de la Joie de Vivre prize. in July 2013, Richard received an honorary fellowship and honorary doctorate in recognition of his outstanding contribution to the field of photography from University of the Arts London. In October 2013, Young's candid photograph of Freddie Mercury at home was inducted into the National Portrait Gallery, London.

In the summer of 2014, Young was inducted into the Champagne wine fraternity "L'Ordre des Côteaux de Champagne", in the Le Palais du Tau.

In February 2015, the UK Picture Editors Guild presented the Chairman's Award to Young for his significant contribution and talent in the field of photography.

In February 2026, he was featured on BBC Radio 4's Desert Island Discs.

== Personal life ==
Richard and Susan Young have three children. in February 2026, Young was a guest on Desert Island Discs interviewed by Lauren Laverne.

== Books ==
- By Invitation Only by Richard Young (photographs) and Christopher Wilson (text), (1981) ISBN 978-0-7043-3387-1
- Paparazzo! by Richard Young (photographs) and Sally Moulsdale (text), (1989) ISBN 978-0-491-03534-7
- Shooting Stars by Richard Young (photographs) and Susan Young (text) ISBN 978-1-84358-096-6
- Nightclubbing by Richard Young (photographs) and Susan Young (text) ISBN 978-0-99294-240-3
