= Ritz Newspaper =

British magazine

- Ritz Newspaper Masthead
- Co-editor: David Bailey, David Litchfield
- Categories: fashion, gossip and celebrity
- Frequency: monthly
- Publisher: David Bailey, David Litchfield
- Founded: 1976
- First issue: December 1976
- Final issue: 1997
- Company: Bailey Litchfield Productions Ltd
- Country: United Kingdom
- Language: English
- ISSN: 0144-7416

Ritz Newspaper, colloquially Ritz Magazine, sometimes simply Ritz, was a British magazine focusing on gossip, celebrity and fashion. It was launched in 1976 by David Bailey and David Litchfield, who acted as co-editors. The magazine folded in 1997.

== History ==
The first issue of Ritz was published in December 1976. Published on newsprint and described by Litchfield as "the Lou Reed of publishing", it sold 25,000 copies a month at its peak in 1981. It ran for fifteen years, though at the beginning of the 1990s it lost readership to glossy titles such as Tatler. It closed temporarily in 1983 and in October 1988. Redesigned in A4 format on matte art stock paper by art director Tony Judge, it relaunched early in 1989 with funding from the property developer Neville Roberts, finally closing in 1997.

== Gossip ==
Cover of issue 15 featuring Jordan

The founder gossip columnists covering the London social scene were Nicholas Haslam, Frances Lynn, Stephen Lavers and Amanda Lear.

Haslam, an Old Etonian society decorator, wrote about his British aristocratic and Hollywood movie star friends under the pen name Paul Parsons. Lynn wrote the 'Bitch' gossip column about café society. Lavers, who moonlighted as Head of Films at A&M Records was the Music and Media columnist. Lear gossiped about the international glitterati. Lavers and Lear even interviewed each other. Richard Young was initially hired as Lynn's photographer, but eventually took photographs for all the columns. The four gossip columnists sometimes attended the same parties and wrote about each other. Haslam invited Lynn to all the parties he organised for his celebrity friends like Andy Warhol, so that she could report about them in her column.

Film producer Cat Villiers (then known as Catkin Villiers) began her career on the staff of the periodical.

Although Ritz Newspaper's policy was to avoid paying their contributing editors, including photojournalist Clement Barclay, established writers like Clive James and Peter York contributed to the magazine, as occasionally did established pop and rock stars such as George Michael.

== Fashion ==
Ritz Newspaper was a showcase for fashion photography. David Bailey took the pictures. His wife, Marie Helvin, and other celebrity fashion models modelled, and Patrick Lichfield and other top photographers, such as Barry Lategan worked for Ritz.

== Celebrity ==
The majority of the celebrity interviews were in question and answer format, and included David Cassidy (interviewed by George Michael), Sammy Davis Jr., Gore Vidal, Paul McCartney and Frank Zappa.

== Advertising ==
Ritz Newspaper specialised in celebrity advertising campaigns. Olympus Cameras, Leonard the society hairdresser, and Manolo Blahnik all took out regular campaigns. Schumi advertised in every issue of Ritz, except for the first issue.
