= Arusa Qureshi =

British author and writer

Arusa Qureshi is a British author and writer based in Edinburgh, Scotland. Formerly Editor of The List, she has also written for The Guardian, Time Out, NME and others. Her writing extensively covers music, from Hang Linton, Tupac, and pop, with a focus on Hip Hop in her most recent book. She is the editor of The Fest magazine, which covers the Edinburgh Fringe Festival.

== Early life ==
Qureshi graduated with a Scottish Master of Arts (MA) in English literature from the University of Edinburgh in 2015. She subsequently completed a Master of Science (MSc) in Magazine Publishing at Edinburgh Napier University in 2016 on the Carnegie Cameron Bursary.

== Career ==
Alongside her writing, she is the published author of Flip the Script: How Women Came to Rule Hip Hop. The book began with a commission in 2015, with Qureshi's first article in the List. Since then, Flip the Script has been reviewed in detail by the Scotsman, exploring how women in Hip Hop break into the mainstream.

She curates 'AMPLIFI' sessions at the Queen's Hall in Edinburgh, which showcase rising talent in Scotland. In 2023, she was appointed the Music Programme Manager for Summerhall Arts in Edinburgh. She is a chair on the board for the Scottish Music Centre, and also chairs the Music Venue Trust.

== Awards and honours ==
In 2017, she was shortlisted for the PPA Scotland's Young Journalist of the Year award. She received the Allen Wright Award for journalism.

== Works ==
- Flip the Script: How Women Came to Rule Hip Hop, 2021: 404 Ink Limited
