= Partition (1987 film) =

1987 film by Ken McMullen

Partition is a film by director Ken McMullen. The film is set in the turmoil surrounding the transfer of political power in British India from British to Indian hands and the Partition of the Indian subcontinent into the Dominion of Pakistan and the Republic of India in 1947. Made in 1987, the film was released on DVD in 2007. Its screening has been voted Time Out Critics' choice No 1 after 20 years.

== Plot ==
Lunatics in an asylum see the horror of India's partition with a lucidity that seems to escape the seemingly sane political players directing it on the outside.

== Principal cast ==
- Saeed Jaffrey
- Zia Mohyeddin
- Bhasker Patel
- Roshan Seth
- Zohra Sehgal
- John Shrapnel
- Tariq Yunus

== Principal crew ==
- Ken McMullen – Director
- Lynn Horsford – Producer
- Tariq Ali and Ken McMullen – Writers
- Saadat Hassan Manto – Original story
- Nanci Scheiesari – Cinematographer
- Paul Cheetham – Production Designer

Music composed by Barrie Guard
