= European Energy Centre =

Coordinates: 55°54′33″N 3°19′12″W

- Established: 1975 with Centro Studi Galileo
- Location: London, United Kingdom Edinburgh, Scotland, United Kingdom
- Website: www.renewableinstitute.org

The European Energy Centre (EEC) Institute is an independent professional educational body for the renewable energy, energy efficiency and electric vehicles sectors. The EEC along with the affiliated Centro Studi Galileo runs a biennial European Conference on renewable energy, heating and cooling applications. EEC's focus is on renewable energy education, training and conferences to help develop a workforce capable of designing, installing, repairing and maintaining renewable energy equipment and managing renewable energy projects.

The European Energy Centre and Centro Studi Galileo work with the United Nations Environment Programme (UNEP) the Intergovernmental International Institute of Refrigeration and Centro Studi Galileo, along with Universities such as Edinburgh Napier University and Heriot-Watt University in promoting the use of renewable energy technologies across the United Kingdom.

The European Energy Centre is also active European-wide with conferences in refrigeration, air conditioning and renewable energy, specifically Heating and Cooling technologies, see the 14th European Conference at Heriot-Watt University, Edinburgh.

The training activities of the European Energy Centre, the European Centre of Technology, and its parent company Centro Studi Galileo are promoted through partners.

The European Energy Centre is also active in India with training courses and conferences with its Indian Partner TERRE Policy Centre.

== Main activities of the organisation ==
- European conferences organised with the UN (UNEP) on the latest technologies in renewable energy
- Publications with the United Nations Environment Programme
- Promotion of best practices in renewable energy through training technicians and personnel
- Launching the Green New Deal in Europe and India
