= Andrew and Jeremy Get Married =

- DVD cover
- Directed by: Don Boyd
- Written by: Don Boyd
- Produced by: FirstSight Films; Clare Boyd; Don Boyd
- Cinematography: Don Boyd; Kate Boyd
- Edited by: Kate Spankie
- Distributed by: Tartan Films (UK); Gavin Films (Worldwide)
- Release dates: 9 September 2004 (Canada); 6 May 2005 (UK)
- Running time: 75 minutes
- Country: United Kingdom
- Language: English

Andrew and Jeremy Get Married is a 2004 British documentary film written and directed by Don Boyd for the BBC. It tells the story of two Englishmen, Andrew Thomas and Jeremy Trafford, as they plan for their commitment ceremony. Originally commissioned for the BBC Storyville series, the film premiered at the 2004 Toronto International Film Festival.

== Synopsis ==
The film follows the story of one of the first same-sex couples to take advantage of Mayor of London Ken Livingstone's civil register, prior to the advent of civil partnerships and gay marriage, which legalised same-sex unions. When the film was made, neither ceremony was available to gay couples.

Jeremy (69) is a Cambridge-educated English professor who was raised in India, while Andrew (or Andy) (49) is a retired bus driver and ex-junkie from a Croydon council estate. They met each other at Bromptons Club, a legendary gay bar in Earl's Court, London. The film has scenes of their relationship in the months leading up to their big day.

== People featured ==
- Andrew Thomas
- Jeremy Trafford
- Hanif Kureishi

== Reception ==
DC reviewing of Time Out said it "is illuminating and touching, if rather light. It probably belongs on TV".

Nick Dawson of Empire gave the film 3 stars out of 5, and stated it was an "intimate study of a gay couple" and "the commitment ceremony sadly feels a lot more hollow than it should".

In 2004, Don Boyd was nominated for the Joris Ivens Award for best documentary at the Amsterdam International Documentary Film Festival. In 2005 the film was nominated for the British Independent Film Award for best British documentary.

== Aftermath ==
Three years after the film, Andrew Thomas died of lung cancer at age 51. In spring 2020, Jeremy Trafford died at age 85 after contracting COVID-19.
