= My Kingdom (film) =

2001 film by Don Boyd

- Directed by: Don Boyd
- Screenplay by: Nick Davies
- Starring: Richard Harris; Lynn Redgrave; Jimi Mistry
- Release date: 2001
- Country: United Kingdom

My Kingdom is a 2001 British crime film directed by Don Boyd and starring Richard Harris, Lynn Redgrave and Jimi Mistry.

It premiered at the 2001 Toronto International Film Festival on the eve of 9/11 and like many films that year was consequently compromised commercially. It was subsequently previewed in Los Angeles to heighten nomination opportunities for the performance of Richard Harris later that year and was well reviewed by the Los Angeles Times and Variety.

The film, co-scripted by Boyd with The Guardian journalist Nick Davies and drawing on both their researches into the London and Liverpool criminal underworld (which in Boyd's case included the Kray brothers), brought Boyd into conflict with its principal lead Richard Harris, who wanted to rewrite the script. The film was released in the United Kingdom by Tartan Films receiving mixed reviews while generally acknowledging a fine performance from Harris who was nominated for a British Independent Film Award. Harris acknowledged his approval for the final film at a valedictory event held at the Cambridge Film Festival months before his death.

== Cast ==
- Richard Harris as "Sandeman"
- Reece Noi as The Boy
- Lynn Redgrave as Mandy
- Tom Bell as "Quick"
- Emma Catherwood as Jo
- Aidan Gillen as Puttnam
- Louise Lombard as Kath
- Paul McGann as Dean
- Jimi Mistry as "Jug"
- Lorraine Pilkington as Tracy
- Colin Salmon as "The Chair"
- James Foy as "Animal"
- James McMartin as "Mineral"
- Danny Lawrence as "Tigger"
- Gerard Starkey as Minder
- Sasha Johnson Manning as Soprano
- Seamus O'Neill as "Snowy"
- Chris Armstrong as Dutch Farmer
- Ingi Thor Jonsson as Dutch Farmer
- Otis Graham as Delroy
- David Yip as "Merv"
- Kieran O'Brien as The Photographer
- Jack Marsden as Billy "The Whizz"
- Amer Nazir as "Mutt"
- Mushi Noor as Jeff
- Carl Learmond as Rudi
- Anthony Dorrs as "Skunk"
- Steve Foster as "Toffee"
- Oscar James as Desmond
- Sylvia Gatril as The Brothel Receptionist
- Sharon Byatt as Annie
- Desmond Bayliss as John "The Dog"
- Kelly Murphy as Karen
- Leanne Burrows as Miss Joy
