= Renewable Energy Institute =

Global professional and educational body on renewable energy

Coordinates: 55°54′33″N 3°19′12″W

- Established: 1975 with Centro Studi Galileo - European Energy Centre
- Subsidiaries: Centro Studi Galileo Milan; Casale Monferrato, Rome; Padova, Genova; Bari (Italy); Pune (India)
- Location: London, United Kingdom; Edinburgh, Scotland, United Kingdom
- Website: www.renewableinstitute.org

The Renewable Energy Institute is the global professional and educational body for the renewable energy and low carbon sectors. Its focus is on education and professional membership for those working and upskilling to work in renewable energy, energy storage, energy efficiency, energy conservation, hydrogen energy, and electric vehicles. The Renewable Energy Institute is the first Renewable Energy Institute in the Western Hemisphere. The Renewable Energy Institute, in cooperation with the affiliated European Energy Centre, European Centre of Technology, and Centro Studi Galileo, runs a biennial European Conference on renewable energy, heating, and cooling applications. The institute was founded to assist with renewable energy education, training, and conferences and to help develop a workforce capable of designing, installing, repairing, and maintaining renewable energy equipment and managing renewable energy projects.

The Renewable Energy Institute, European Energy Centre, European Centre of Technology, and Centro Studi Galileo work with the United Nations Environment Programme (UNEP) and the Intergovernmental International Institute of Refrigeration and Centro Studi Galileo, along with Universities such as Edinburgh Napier University and Heriot-Watt University in promoting the use of renewable energy technologies across the United Kingdom.

The Renewable Energy Institute is also active European-wide with workshops and conferences in renewable energy, Heating and Cooling technologies, see the 14th European Conference at Heriot-Watt University, Edinburgh.

The training activities of the institute, the European Centre of Technology, and its parent company Centro Studi Galileo are promoted through international and global partners.

== Activities of the Institute ==
- European conferences organised with the UN (UNEP) on the latest technologies in renewable energy
- Publications with the United Nations Environment Programme
- Promotion of best practices in renewable energy through training technicians and personnel
- Launching the Green New Deal in Europe, the United States of America, and India
