= Will Whitehorn =

British business executive (born 1960)

Will Whitehorn OBE
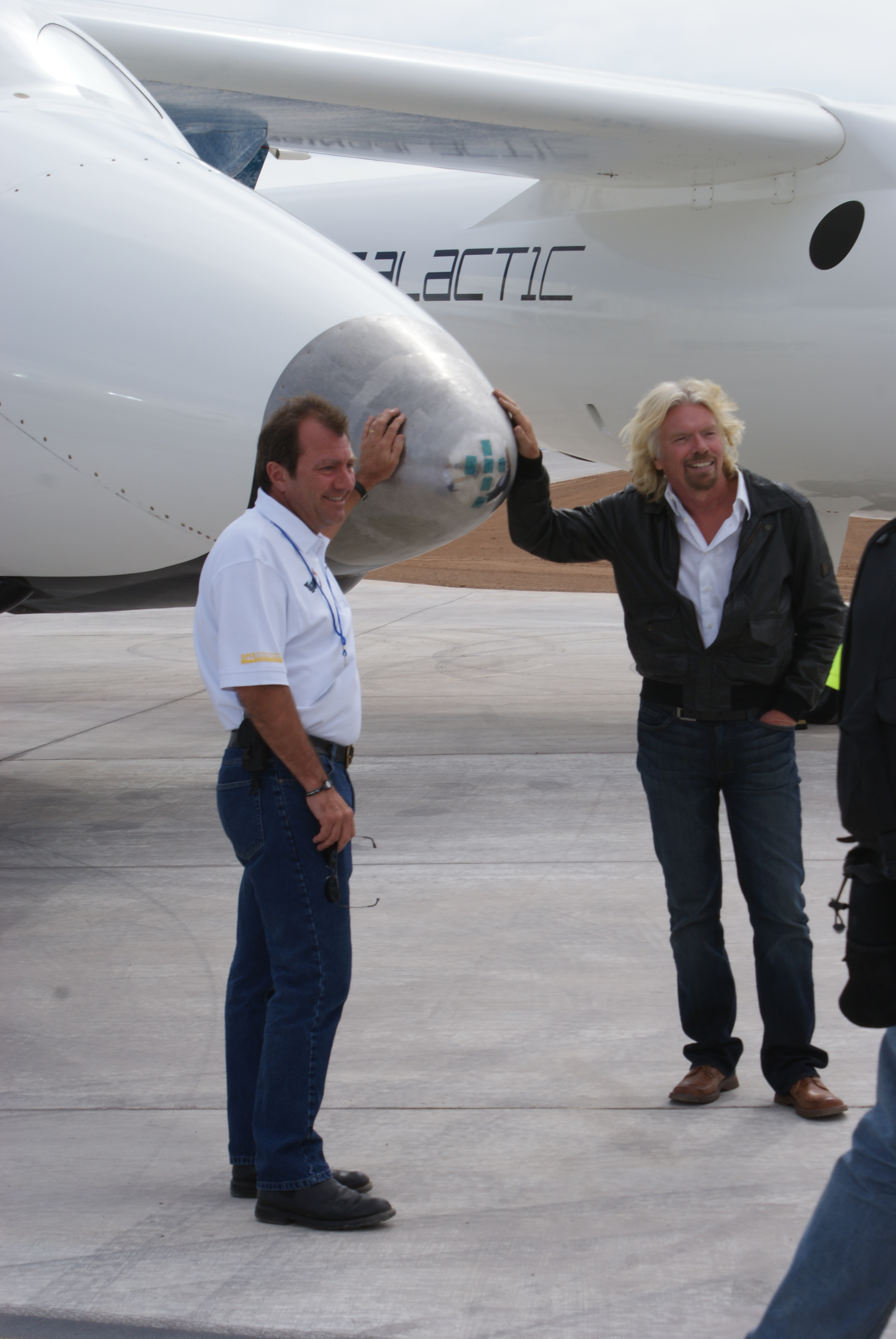
- Will Whitehorn OBE and Richard Branson at the nose of SpaceShipTwo in 2010

Chancellor of Edinburgh Napier University
- Incumbent
- Assumed office 2021
- Preceded by: David Eustace

Personal details
- Born: 1960 (age 65–66) Edinburgh, Scotland, UK
- Education: Edinburgh Academy
- Alma mater: University of Aberdeen
- Profession: Business executive

William Elliott Whitehorn OBE (born 1960) is a British business executive. Until December 2010 he was President of Virgin Galactic, a company which plans to offer space tourism flights to the paying public. He was formerly the President of the industry group, UKspace, and has been Chancellor of Edinburgh Napier University since 2021.

== Biography ==
Whitehorn was born in Edinburgh, Scotland along with siblings Donald, Edward and Katherine. He attended Edinburgh Academy and Aberdeen University. He was an air cadet in his teenage years.

Whitehorn's early career was as a crewman on North Sea helicopters and also with the Thomas Cook travel agency. In 1987, Whitehorn joined Virgin Group after being talent-spotted by Sir Richard Branson, after he had suggested a number of ideas to Virgin the previous year. He rose to become the head of Virgin's public affairs department. In that role, where he was effectively the official spokesperson for the company, he was sometimes characterized as Branson's "right-hand man".

From 2007 to 2011 he was president of Virgin's space program, Virgin Galactic, but left owing to the relocation of the testing area. Since 2011 he has been a non-executive director of Stagecoach Group, where he was appointed Deputy Chairman in 2016, and he has the same roles at Good Energy.

Whitehorn was Chairman of the Transport Systems Catapult project from 2013 to 2016, and President of the Chartered Institute of Logistics and Transport in the UK for 2016–17.

In 2025, Whitehorn was awarded an OBE in the King's Birthday Honours for services to the aerospace and space industry.

== Bibliography ==
- "First Edinburgh Man in Space". Red Orbit. 10 October 2004. Archived from the original on 8 February 2008.
