= Bill Douglas Cinema Museum =

Coordinates: 50.7333°N 3.5341°W

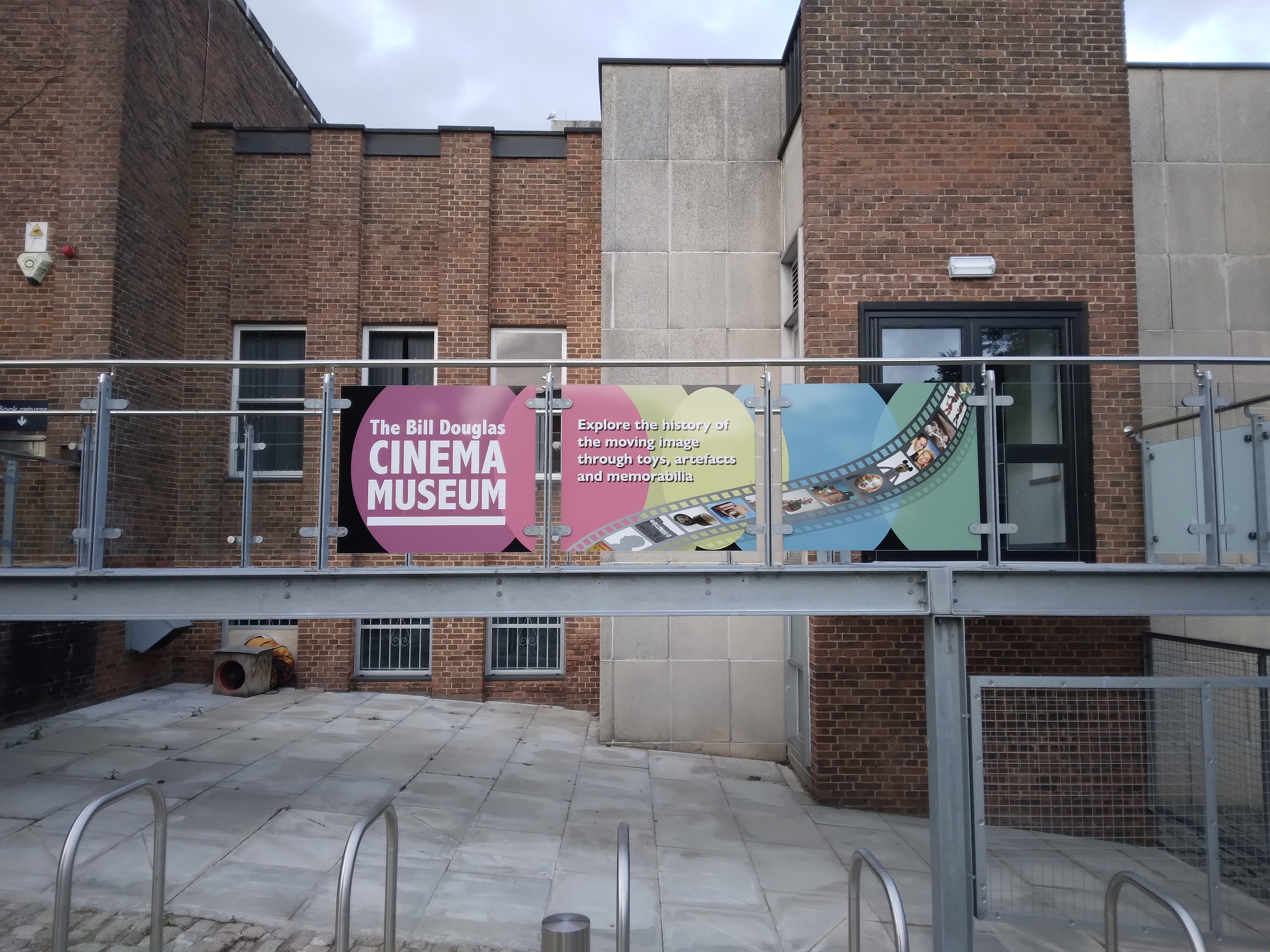
- The museum entrance in 2023
- Former name: The Bill Douglas Centre for the History of Cinema and Popular Culture
- Established: 1994
- Location: The Old Library, University of Exeter, Prince of Wales Road, Exeter
- Type: Public museum, Research centre
- Accreditation: Arts Council England accredited museum
- Key holdings: Bill Douglas and Peter Jewell‘s collection
- Collection size: Over 93,000 items
- Visitors: ~8000 (2022/23)
- Academic Director: Professor Helen M Hanson
- Chairperson: Patrick Swaffer
- Owner: The Exeter University Foundation
- Public transit access: Exeter St David’s, Exeter Central
- Website: www.bdcmuseum.org.uk

The Bill Douglas Cinema Museum (formerly the Bill Douglas Centre for the History of Cinema and Popular Culture) is a public museum and an academic research facility on the Streatham Campus of the University of Exeter in England. Founded in 1994 and opened to the public in 1997, the museum houses one of Britain's largest public collections of books, prints, artefacts and ephemera relating to the history and prehistory of cinema.

The museum has two galleries of exhibits which are open to the public. There is a reading room for researchers to access and consult materials from the collection by appointment.

The museum is named after the filmmaker Bill Douglas. The collection that Douglas put together with his friend Peter Jewell founded the museum; many other donors have added to the holdings since. The museum now holds over 80,000 artefacts from the seventeenth century to the present day. There is a large collection of material on optical media prior to the invention of cinema including holdings on magic lanterns, shadow puppets, panoramas and dioramas, optical illusions and peep shows. There are also significant holdings on cinema pioneers, early and silent cinema, film stars, such as Charlie Chaplin and Marilyn Monroe, and film publicity material and merchandising up to the present day.

There are also a number of filmmakers' production archives, including Bill Douglas's working papers, the Townley Cooke collection, and the archives of producer/director Don Boyd, and producers Gavrik Losey and James Mackay.
