= Intimate Reflections =

1975 British film

- Directed by: Don Boyd
- Screenplay by: Richard Meyrick
- Produced by: Don Boyd
- Starring: Anton Rodgers; Lillias Walker; Sally Anne Newton
- Cinematography: Keith Goddard
- Edited by: Clive Muller
- Production company: Kendon Films
- Release date: 4 November 1974
- Running time: 86 minutes
- Country: United Kingdom
- Language: English

Intimate Reflections is a 1975 British independent drama film directed by Don Boyd and starring Anton Rodgers, Lillias Walker, Sally Anne Newton and Jonathan David. It was Boyd's first feature film and premiered at the 1975 London Film Festival. Boyd described it as a study both of sexual infidelity and the clash between youth and middle-age.

== Plot ==
Robert and Jane are a middle-aged couple grieving over a dead daughter. Michael and Zonny are a young couple with a bright future ahead of them. The film dwells on their parallel lives.

== Cast ==
- Anton Rodgers as Michael White
- Lillias Walker as Zonny
- Sally Anne Newton as Jane
- Jonathan David as Robert
- Peter Vaughan as salesman
- Derek Bond as bank manager

== Production ==
Boyd had hoped to interest British Lion in the film as a 'British Emanuelle' but in the event they backed out, branding it as 'very specialised fare', although Michael Deeley did lend Boyd £500 to take it to the States and tart it around as his 'calling card'.

== Reception ==
The film attracted little attention outside the 1975 London Film Festival and its limited theatrical release in the UK.

The Observer called it "fatuously arty." The Sunday Telegraph reviewer wrote "I wish I could like Intimate Relations more than I do." Evening Standard felt "bits of [the film] which are good to very good... well worth a look." The Daily Telegraph felt it was "not quite successful."

The Monthly Film Bulletin wrote: "A virtual anthology of false 'good' ideas rendered in a thrice-told arts-and-crafts manner of endless replays, the film cannot even take up a relatively modest notion or conceit ... without driving it into the ground."

Time Out (New York) wrote: "Surely the worst film of the year ... no amount of special pleading, bonhomie towards experiment, or explanation of motive can hide the fact that the result is like a synthesis of every bad detail of every bad undergraduate film you've ever seen."
