= A Talent for Murder (1983 film) =

British television film

- Genre: Mystery
- Based on: A Talent for Murder by Jerome Chodorov & Norman Panama
- Directed by: Alvin Rakoff
- Starring: Angela Lansbury; Laurence Olivier; Hildegard Neil
- Country of origin: United Kingdom
- Original language: English

Production
- Producer: Cedric Messina
- Running time: 80 minutes
- Production companies: BBC; Centerpoint Productions

Original release
- Network: BBC Two
- Release: 19 December 1983

A Talent for Murder is a 1983 British television film directed by Alvin Rakoff, starring Angela Lansbury, Laurence Olivier and Hildegard Neil; the 1981, Edgar Award winning Broadway play of the same name, written by Jerome Chodorov and Norman Panama, starred Jean-Pierre Aumont and Claudette Colbert. The film was produced by the BBC and originally aired on BBC Two in December 1983 in the UK, and on Showtime in January 1984 in the US.

Set in a New York country mansion but shot in Britain, Lansbury's performance as a crime writer anticipated her long-running role in the CBS show Murder, She Wrote.

== Plot ==
Anne Royce McClain is a successful murder mystery writer living on her New York estate, in a mansion full of priceless artwork (some of it by former lovers) and a collection of her own first editions and manuscripts. She shares the house with her diminished capacity, childlike granddaughter Pamela (injured in the accident which killed her parents), and Rashi, her Rajasthani factotum... who is also an electronics wizard on parole from the penitentiary. He has recently installed several devices, including fire and burglar alarms.

Anne is physically disabled and uses a motorised wheelchair, but despite her condition, she still continues to publish bestselling mystery novels. Her nights include drinking cognac and tossing still lit cigarillos into wastepaper baskets – which sets off the smoke alarm and wakes the local fire chief at all hours.

She invites her immediate family and her old friend and former lover Dr. Anthony Wainwright, who lives in Paris, to celebrate her 64th birthday - though when asked her age ranges at whim from 50 to 70. She shares with Tony the news that she is about to receive an Edgar award.

While some of the family attend a Tanglewood concert, Anne and Tony learn that her daughter-in-law, Sheila, is scheming to get control of Anne's twenty-plus-million-dollar estate through her husband, Anne's weak-willed son Lawrence, by having Anne committed and Pamela institutionalized; Mark Harrison, Pamela's husband, is having an affair with Sheila and is privy to the scheme. Anne records their revealing conversation.

In a confrontation between them, Sheila learns that Anne has the tape and vows to have her "put away"; she sneaks back early from another performance to steal the tape from Anne's library... and falls victim to an elaborate garage trap, the prototype for Anne's latest whodunit.

Mark learned of the tape from Sheila before her death and attempts to steal it, then tries to bully and blackmail Anne into selling her art collection so he can realize 'his' share of the estate. Instead, Anne triggers the smoke alarm; with the household assembled she announces her plans to give her art collection to the MoMA and the house to a local historical society and will draw up the papers in the morning.

When Anne falls asleep watching a late-night movie someone douses the floor around her chair with brandy, makes a trail of it to a wastepaper basket, sets the basket alight with one of Anne's trademark cigarillos, and leaves. As the smoke alarm goes off Rashi leaps from the chair, sheds the shawl and wig he was wearing and puts out the flames with the oft-used, ever-present soda syphon. He and Anne exchange 'thumbs-up' as they whiz past each other in identical chairs, she entering and he leaving the library.

Again, the household collects, Mark loudly proclaiming that this time Anne almost set herself on fire. But, using a device from one of her books, Anne proves beyond question that it was Mark who has just tried to kill her, and likely killed Sheila; the attack was witnessed by herself and Rashi, and Pamela walks in wearing the black hat, cape and night-vision goggles Mark used. For Pamela's sake, Anne offers Mark a hefty envelope of cash and time to catch a scheduled flight to Australia before calling the police. When Mark tests her, she immediately picks up the phone... Mark snatches the envelope from her hand and dashes out of the room.

The furor dies down, most go back to bed, and Anne and Tony are left alone in the library. Anne reveals that she can actually walk: "Well, I like the image of a helpless old woman, everybody dancing attendance and kissing her behind." She describes how 'she' committed Sheila's murder, ending: "That's exactly how you did it, isn't it, Doc." Tony admits that he did, that he has loved Anne for 40 years and would do anything to protect her and Pamela. Anne admits that her episodic disorientation and 'talking' to her late husband Bill are all part of an act... and reflects on the lonely future awaiting her. Tony asks permission to stay with her instead of going back to Paris, Anne agrees, and they settle down to another game of chess... as the smoke alarm goes off yet again.

== Cast ==
- Angela Lansbury as Anne Royce McClain
- Laurence Olivier as Dr. Anthony Wainwright
- Tariq Yunus as Rashi
- Hildegard Neil as Sheila McClain
- Charles Keating as Lawrence McClain
- Garrick Hagon as Mark Harrison
- Tracey Childs as Pamela Harrison

== Bibliography ==
- Parish, James Robert. The Unofficial Murder, She Wrote Casebook. Kensington Books, 1997.
