= The Fry Chronicles =

Second autobiography of Stephen Fry

The Fry Chronicles: An Autobiography
- Author: Stephen Fry
- Cover artist: David Eustace
- Language: English
- Series: Stephen Fry's An Autobiography
- Genre: Autobiography
- Publisher: Penguin Books
- Publication date: 13 September 2010
- Publication place: United Kingdom
- Media type: Print (hardback & paperback); Digital (eBook and iOS application); Audiobook
- Pages: 448 pp
- ISBN: 0-7181-5791-5
- Preceded by: Moab Is My Washpot: An Autobiography
- Followed by: More Fool Me: A Memoir

The Fry Chronicles: An Autobiography is the 2010 autobiography of Stephen Fry. The book is a continuation from the end of his 1997 publication of his first autobiography, Moab Is My Washpot: An Autobiography. Though without a strict chronology, it concentrates on a seven-year period of Fry's life, taking up the story after his release from prison, his time at the University of Cambridge and his career in comedy by the late 1980s.

The book is Fry's ninth, and his second volume of autobiography. Critics have called the book "candid, sincere, and charming, with insightful commentary if occasionally flat stories".

It was published by Michael Joseph on 13 September 2010 in the United Kingdom and in the United States. It was simultaneously published as an e-book (in regular and an enhanced version), an audiobook, and an iOS application by ePenguin; both imprints of Penguin Books.

== Background ==
Fry travelled to Los Angeles in January 2010 to write his second autobiography, when he publicly announced his "self-imposed exile" from various online services, such as Twitter. Fry returned to Britain and various online services in late April 2010. He publicly announced his return on his blog that there had been a few "exceptions" to his self-imposed exile and that he planned to gradually return to Twitter, so as not to annoy his followers. In it he also described his life while working on his book, saying that he wrote solely in the mornings, from "about 5 AM till lunchtime", leaving afternoons and early evenings for "other things". He acknowledges his "peculiar" lifestyle when writing, saying it is "the only way to coax a book out of me".

== Contents ==
Stephen Fry's first memoir, Moab Is My Washpot: An Autobiography, published in 1997, told of his life up to the age of 18, when he was told that, despite his delinquent adolescence, he had won a scholarship to Queens' College in Cambridge.

The Fry Chronicles tells of his life up to his 30th birthday, covering his time at university, his rise to success as a writer and performer, meeting Emma Thompson, Hugh Laurie and Rowan Atkinson as he makes his way through sketch shows, and his rise to fame on Saturday Live and Blackadder, while his version of the musical Me and My Girl with Mike Ockrent becomes a global success and makes him a modest fortune while he is still in his twenties. Subsequently, many articles he has written are recalled. The book ends in August 1987, his 30th birthday, at his six-bedroom house in Norfolk.

The dedication of The Fry Chronicles reads simply "To M'Coll" meaning Hugh Laurie. Fry and Laurie both refer to each other as "M'Colleague" in their TV show A Bit of Fry and Laurie.

== Style ==
Chapters in The Fry Chronicles are organised under headings all beginning with the letter "C". The book ends with Fry taking cocaine, a subject that he expands on in his third autobiography More Fool Me: A Memoir.

Fry acknowledges that he uses 100 words where "ten would do" and he defends this as showing his "great, generous love of words".

== Promotion and release ==
The book was launched with a preview performance on 13 September 2010 at the Royal Festival Hall to promote the release of The Fry Chronicles. The event was broadcast, direct via satellite, to 60 locations across the United Kingdom.

== Publication ==
I am as pleased as punch by this wonderful response, but it especially delights me to know that our attempt to offer five such different and distinctive ways of reading and responding to the book has born fruit.

— Stephen Fry on publishing The Fry Chronicles.

The Fry Chronicles was the first publication to be published simultaneously as a conventionally printed book, an electronically enhanced eBook, a non-enhanced eBook, an audiobook narrated by Fry himself and an iOS application. All five publications were released on 13 September 2010. Fry acknowledged in an interview that the publishing "landscape is changing", but insisted that the conventional "paper book is not dead". This method of publication was described by other publishers as "innovative and groundbreaking".

=== eBook ===
It was released as a regular eBook with an electronically enhanced version released exclusively via the iBookstore. The enhanced version includes eight exclusive videos of Fry expanding further on the anecdotes he wrote about in the printed text, integrated photography throughout and links to relevant websites and online content; while the other is simply a digital copy of the printed text, without the interactive content and only the photographs published with the printed text.

=== iOS application ===
The iOS application, titled MyFry, can be used on an iPhone, iPad or iPod. The applications interface is centred on a dynamic index that allows readers to explore the book's content in a non-linear fashion.

== Artwork ==
The feature artwork of the MyFry iOS application.

The photograph on the front cover of the book was taken by David Eustace in June 2010. Eustace was approached by John Hamilton, on behalf of Penguin Books. Fry is dressed in a corduroy jacket and checkered shirt. The pattern used on the hardback book's endpaper coordinates with the socks that Fry is wearing on the book cover.

== Reception ==
The Fry Chronicles debuted at No. 1 on The Sunday Times list of non-fiction best-sellers in England. It sold 37,000 copies in the first five days of its release, outselling the next most popular title, Lee Child's 61 Hours, by 8,000 copies.
