= David Eustace =

Scottish artist and director (born 1961)

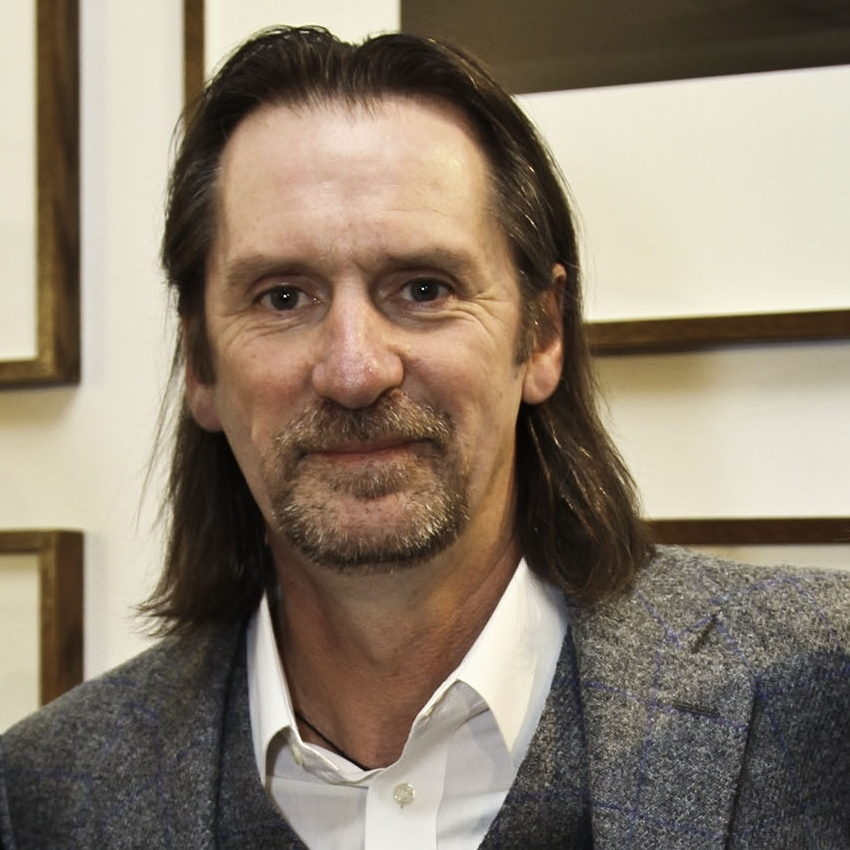
David Eustace

David Eustace (born 23 November 1961) is an international artist and director, primarily known for his portrait photography. He has worked on campaigns for clients worldwide and travelled extensively. His photographic works are included in several collection, both private and public including the Scottish National Portrait Gallery, Glasgow Museum of Modern Art., Deutsche Bank Collection and The City of Edinburgh Art Collection.

== Early life ==
Eustace was raised in Riddrie in the East End of Glasgow, and left school aged sixteen. Undertaking a variety of jobs, Eustace joined the Royal Naval Reserve / HMS Graham, serving on a minesweeper. He left the Navy at 21 and became a prison officer at HM Prison Barlinnie.

His interest in photography began when he was 28 years old and decided to return to further his education, enrolling at Edinburgh Napier University. He graduated in 1991, with a BA distinction in Photographic Studies from Edinburgh Napier University and was later awarded an honorary Doctorate of Arts from the same institution in 2011.

== Career ==
Graduating as a mature student, Eustace began working in London for Conde Nast Publications, (GQ, Vogue, Tatler). From 1994 to 1997, he was listed as a contributing editor/photographer on GQ's masthead.

Primarily known for his portraiture, his sitters include Sophia Loren, Tracey Emin, Sir Paul McCartney, Ewan McGregor and Milton Glaser.

In 2012 and then again in 2014 Panasonic based their national Lumix TV and print campaign around his work where he starred in their cinema and TV commercial.

Eustace became the first photographer to have an exhibition in The Scottish Gallery’s 173 years history.

At the end of 2019 Eustace completed an ongoing portfolio titled “Dear John”. This body of work contains 12 portraits of the artist John Byrne made over a 30-year period with an introduction from Sir Angus Grossart.

Eustace was appointed Chancellor of Edinburgh Napier University in August 2015, a position he held for 6 years.

In 2022 during London Art Week, he presented for the first time a selection of his sculptural work. This exhibition was held at The Fine Art Society London gallery, and also at Sir John Lavery's former studio on Cromwell Place, London.

Eustace also served as a creative consultant to Balblair Whisky from 2019-2023.

== Bibliography ==
- Eustace Ego, The Gallery Cork Street (1998)
- I write to tell you of a baby boy born only yesterday... (Clearview, 2014) ISBN 978-1-908337-21-4
- David Eustace, Selected Works (The Scottish Gallery, 2015) ISBN 978-1-910267-11-0
- Life Studies, selected works by artists David Eustace, Rebecca Westguard, William Crosbie ( The Scottish Gallery, 2016) ISBN 978-1-910267-32-5
- David Eustace, Still | Landscape | Life ( The Scottish Gallery, 2018) ISBN 978-1-910267-86-8

== Exhibitions ==
- Common Lives, Noorderlicht, 1995: Eustace's work was showcased alongside the works of Elliott Erwitt, Duane Michals and Steve Pyke as part of the Groningin Photo Festival.
- EGO, Cork Street, London, 1998: Sponsored by the Deutsche Bank, the EGO exhibition was the subject of a thirty-minute documentary made by the BBC. The show went on to become the first photographic show exhibited at the Glasgow Art Club.
- The Character Project, 2009: Co-hosted by Vanity Fair, the exhibition went on a six-city tour, opening in New York and closing in Los Angeles.
- 'Highland Heart', Hudson Studios, Manhattan, 2013: Highland Heart was staged in partnership with the Scottish Government and Edinburgh Napier University during New York's Scotland Week. The exhibition was opened by Scotland's First Minister, Alex Salmond.
- Exhibition at the Scottish Gallery, 2015, the first solo show of a photographer ever by that gallery
- 'Life Studies' at the Scottish Gallery, 2016. A series of 25 works focussing on the nude and representation of form.
- 'Still / Landscape / Life' at the Scottish Gallery, 2018.
- 'Unique Work Polaroids' at SWG3, February 2019.
- 'Mar A Bha / Desert Lines' at the Royal Glasgow Institute for the Fine Arts, March 2019. Exhibiting two portfolios.
- 'Conversations with David Eustace' at Marchmont House, April 2022.
- 'Memento Mori' at The Fine Art Society, London 2022.
- 'THEREAFTER' at The Signet Library, Edinburgh 2023.

== Projects ==
- The Character Project, 2008: One of 11 photographers chosen to capture the character of America. David was the only non US citizen chosen, he shot portraits and landscapes as he traveled along the entirety of Route 50. American Character | Chronicle Books
- In Search of Eustace, 2009: Commissioned by Anthropoligie to create a body of work whilst on a road trip with his then teenage daughter, Rachel. the ANTHROPOLOGiST by Anthropologie
- The Weir Group Portfolio, 2011: Commissioned by The Weir Group to document the workers and plants. I’m an introduction: David Eustace’s honest journey | Slave Magazine
- Highland Heart, 2012: A collection of images from the Highlands of Scotland. First shown in New York during Scotland week in 2013.About Scotland | Scottish Facts | Scotland.org
- Scottish Ballet short film 'WHAT DREAMS WE HAVE', 2017: Written and directed by Eustace for Scottish Ballet.What Dreams We Have
- Mar Ah Bha, 2018: Exhibited in The Scottish Gallery as part of Still | Landscape | Life. David Eustace | Still • Landscape • Life In 2019 it was exhibited in The Royal Glasgow Institute for The Fine Arts.RGI Kelly Gallery: David Eustace, Mar A Bha And Desert Lines, Two Portfolios. | Artmag | All The Arts In Scotland
- Thirty Two York Place, 2020: A collection of images of twenty four judges, known as the Senators of the Scottish College of Justice. This portfolio was purchased by The Scottish National Portrait Gallery.David Eustace’s Thirty Two York Place
- Tree, 2020: A special edition portfolio created in collaboration with Hugo Burge and Marchmont House Estate.
- BALBLAIR short film 'PRECIOUS TIME', 2022: Written and directed by Eustace for BALBLAIR whisky.Home | Balblair Highland Single Malt Scotch Whisky
