= Edinburgh Napier University =

University in Scotland

- Former names: Napier Technical College; Napier College of Science and Technology; Napier Polytechnic; Napier University
- Motto: Latin: Nisi sapientia frustra
- Motto in English: Without knowledge, everything is in vain
- Type: Public
- Established: 1992 – granted University status 1964 – Napier Technical College
- Affiliations: Million+ EUA; Universities UK; Universities Scotland
- Budget: £123 million (2015/16)
- Chancellor: Will Whitehorn
- Principal: Sue Rigby
- Academic staff: 802
- Administrative staff: 562
- Students: 13,805 (2024/25)
- Undergraduates: 10,255 (2024/25)
- Postgraduates: 3,550 (2024/25)
- Location: Edinburgh, Scotland, UK
- Campus: Urban
- Colours
- Website: napier.ac.uk

Edinburgh Napier University (Scottish Gaelic: Oilthigh Napier Dhùn Èideann) is a public university in Edinburgh, Scotland. Napier Technical College, the predecessor of the university, was founded in 1964, taking its name from 16th-century Scottish mathematician and philosopher John Napier. The technical college was inaugurated as a university in 1992 by Lord Douglas-Hamilton, becoming Napier University. In 2009, the university was renamed Edinburgh Napier University.

The university is based around its three main Edinburgh campuses: Merchiston, Craiglockhart, and Sighthill. It has over 21,000 students, including those on-campus in Scotland and others studying transnational programmes abroad and online. In 2018 this included nearly 9,500 international and EU students, from more than 140 nations worldwide.

Sue Rigby replaced Andrea Nolan as Principal and Vice Chancellor in January 2025.

== History ==
Napier Technical College was founded in 1964, taking its name from John Napier, who was born in 1550 in the medieval tower house of Merchiston Castle (the site of the university's Merchiston campus). His statue stands in the tower of Merchiston Castle today. An opening ceremony was held on 23 February 1965. In 1966, it was renamed Napier College of Science and Technology. In 1974, it merged with the Sighthill-based Edinburgh College of Commerce to form Napier College of Commerce and Technology, which became a Central Institution in 1985.

The college was renamed Napier Polytechnic in 1986 and in the same year acquired the former Hydropathic hospital buildings at Craiglockhart. In June 1992, the institution officially became Napier University. At a ceremony witnessed by over 700 staff and students, Lord James Douglas Hamilton and the then Principal, William Turmeau, unveiled the new university sign at Merchiston. In 1994, Napier University acquired its Craighouse Campus. In 1996, the university gained a new Faculty of Health Studies through a merger between the Scottish Borders College of Nursing and Lothian College of Health Studies. In February 2009, it became Edinburgh Napier University.

Edinburgh Napier has been awarded the Queen's Anniversary Prize twice. Its most recent win came in 2015 when it was recognised for its work in timber engineering, sustainable construction, and wood science. Edinburgh Napier was previously awarded the Queen's Anniversary Prize in 2009 when the award was made for 'Innovative housing construction for environmental benefit and quality of life'. This recognised the contribution made by the university's Building Performance Centre towards improving sound insulation between attached dwellings.

The motto of the university, Nisi sapientia frustra (meaning "Without knowledge, [all is] in vain"), echoes the motto of the City of Edinburgh Council, Nisi Dominus frustra (meaning "Without [the] Lord, [all is] in vain"). Edinburgh Napier's Tartan was launched at the same time as the name change in February 2009. Previously, the university used the Clan Napier Tartan; the Chief of Clan Napier welcomed the new university tartan.

== Campuses ==
The university is based around its three main campuses at Merchiston, Craiglockhart and Sighthill.

=== Sighthill Campus ===
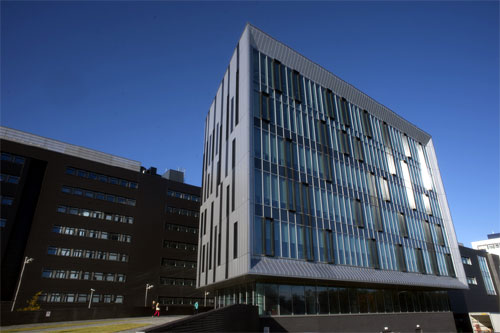
Exterior of Edinburgh Napier University's Sighthill Campus

The Sighthill Campus opened to students in the School of Health & Social Care and the School of Applied Sciences in January 2011. The campus includes a five-storey learning resource centre, 25 specialised teaching rooms including clinical skills laboratories, three IT-enabled lecture theatres and seminar rooms, a clinical skills suite and integrated sports facilities. The campus has been certified as BREEAM Excellent for best practice in sustainable design.

The Sighthill campus is also home to a new sports facility which includes a biomechanics laboratory and an environmental chamber that can recreate high altitude conditions with controllable temperature and humidity levels to simulate varying climatic conditions. In 2016, the gym facilities at Sighthill became home to the SRU Fosroc Scottish Rugby Academy Edinburgh.

=== Craiglockhart Campus ===
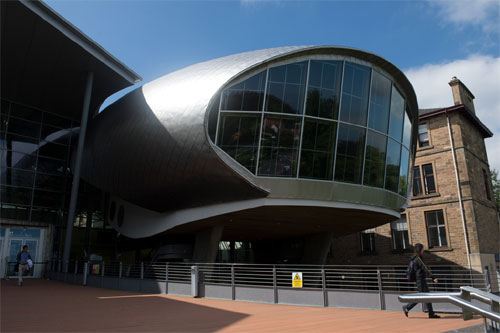
Exterior of Edinburgh Napier University's Craiglockhart Campus

The Craiglockhart Campus is home to The Business School. It incorporates the Craiglockhart Hydropathic Hospital buildings which were for a time known as Craiglockhart War Hospital, where First World War poets Wilfred Owen and Siegfried Sassoon were treated. The Craiglockhart Campus exhibits photography, writing, film and memorabilia to provide a glimpse into the minds of the poets, patients, and medical staff at Craiglockhart. The exhibition also provides a War Poets Collection based on the work of Siegfried Sassoon, Wilfred Owen and selected contemporary poets. The exhibition was officially opened on 11 November 2005 by BBC's World Affairs Correspondent, Allan Little. This campus is the home of the law and business courses and is also operates as a conference centre. The Craiglockhart Campus was extensively refurbished and extended in 2004 and contains two lecture theatres, language labs, computing facilities and an extensive library.

=== Merchiston Campus ===
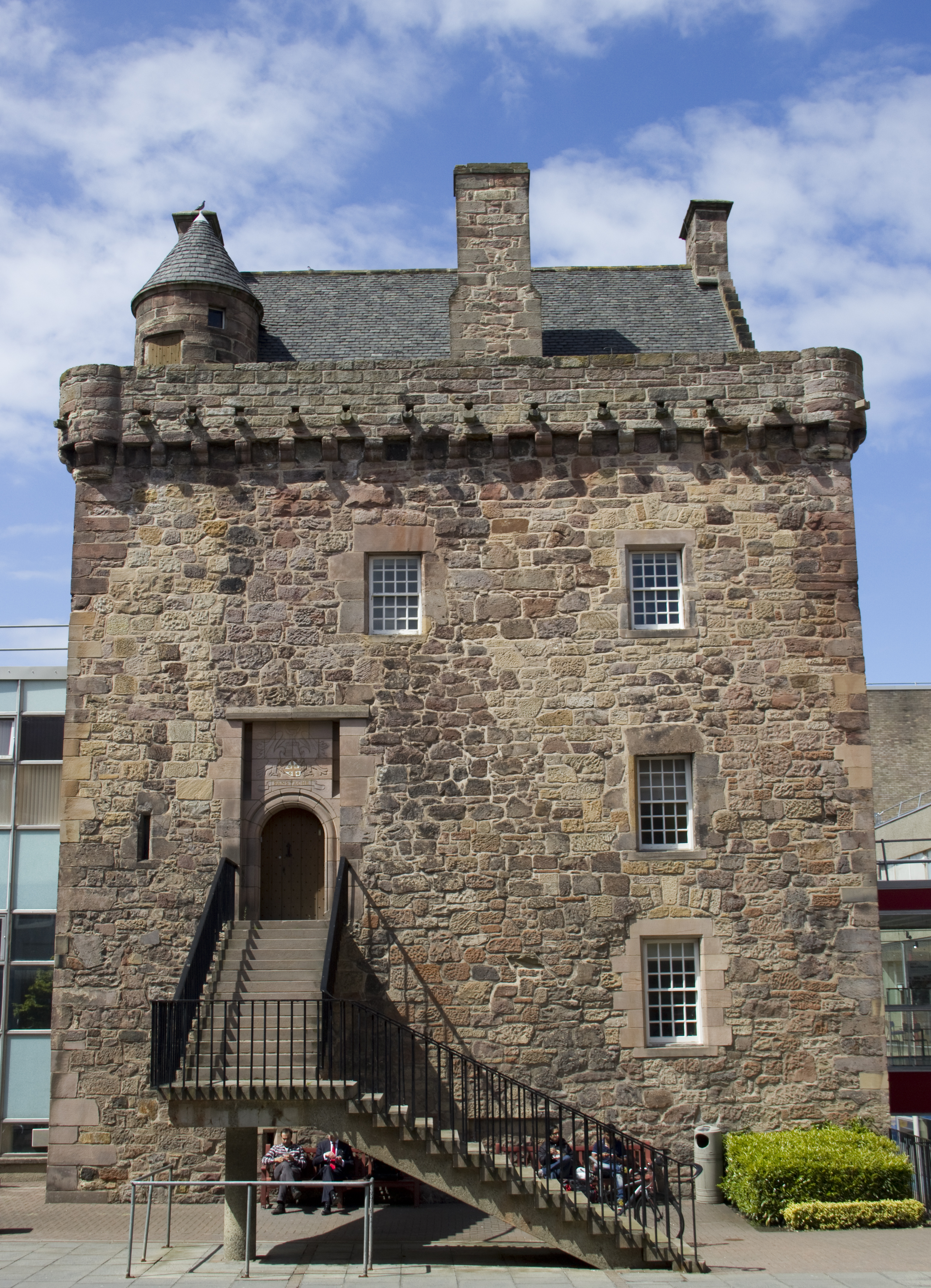
Merchiston Castle in the centre of Merchiston Campus

The Merchiston Campus is home to the Schools of Art & Creative Industries, and Computing, Engineering & the Built Environment. It is built around the refurbished shell of Merchiston Castle, the family home of John Napier, after whom the university is named. Merchiston Castle is also the ancient seat of Clan Napier. Merchiston Castle is currently a "Category A" listed building in Scotland due to its national significance. The campus also includes the 500-seat, 24-hour Jack Kilby Computing Centre, named after the inventor of integrated circuits and the handheld calculator. Facilities for students include a computer game laboratory, and professional music studios and in 2016, TV presenter and University alumna Lorraine Kelly officially opened a new integrated broadcast journalism newsroom.

Edinburgh Napier Students' Association (ENSA) is located at the Merchiston Campus.

It was reported in July 2026 the there are plans to sell the Merchiston campus and move facilities to a former office building in the Gyle.

=== Accommodation ===
Edinburgh Napier has student accommodation located at three sites across the city: Bainfield in Fountainbridge (opened 2014), Slateford Road (opened 2015) and Orwell Terrace (opened 2016).

Edinburgh Napier also provides assistance to students looking to rent in the private sector.

== Organisation and governance ==
Edinburgh Napier University comprises five specialist schools:

- School of Applied Sciences
- School of Arts & Creative Industries
- Business School
- School of Computing, Engineering & the Built Environment
- School of Health & Social Care

=== Governance ===
Edinburgh Napier University's principal and vice-chancellor is Sue Rigby, who succeeded Andrea Nolan in January 2025.

The chancellor is Will Whitehorn, who was installed in August 2021. The Edinburgh-born president of industry group UKspace is also a former executive at the Virgin Group, and also holds boardroom roles at The Scottish Gallery Employee Ownership Trust, Scottish Event Campus, Craneware, Good Energy and AAC Clyde Space AB.

List of chancellors of the Edinburgh Napier University
Sr	Chancellor	Tenure		Notes	Reference
1	George Younger, 4th Viscount Younger of Leckie	1995	2002	Defence (1986–89) and Scottish secretary (1979-86)	
2	Tim Waterstone	2007	2015	Waterstones founder	
3	David Eustace	2015	2021	Alumnus, Portrait photographer	
4	Will Whitehorn	2021	Incumbent	Virgin Galactic president (2007–11)	

== Academic profile ==
Edinburgh Napier offers subjects including engineering, computing, nursing and midwifery, science, business, timber engineering and transport studies. It offers a range of creative courses, including film, graphic design, music, acting, publishing and product design.

Edinburgh Napier University has twice been awarded the Queen's Anniversary Prize for Higher and Further Education. In 2009, it won the Engineering & Technology prize for its "innovative housing construction for environmental benefit and quality of life". In 2015, it won the Environment and Conservation prize for "new standards in timber construction".

Screen Academy Scotland is a ScreenSkills-approved training provider and is a collaboration between Edinburgh Napier University and Edinburgh College of Art (ECA). Patrons of the academy include Judi Dench and Brian Cox, with Tilda Swinton an ambassador.

=== Rankings ===
Rankings
National rankings
- Complete (2027): 81=
- Guardian (2027): 91
- Times / Sunday Times (2027): 42

Global rankings
- QS (2027): 801–850
- THE (2026): 601–800

In 2025, Edinburgh Napier ranked 501 – 600th in the Times Higher Education World University Rankings and 801-805th in the QS World University Rankings. It was also rated five stars for teaching, internationalisation and employability by the QS Stars international university rankings. In the Times and The Sunday Times Good University Guide 2021, Edinburgh Napier was ranked the top modern university in Scotland while the 2020 National Student Survey ranked the institution number one for student satisfaction in Edinburgh.

=== Research and knowledge transfer ===
Edinburgh Napier has a wide range of research centres and institutes including:

- Institute for Sustainable Construction
- Transport Research Institute
- Centre for Distributed Computing, Networking and Security
- The Mountain Bike Centre of Scotland
- Scottish Centre for the Book
- Centre for Timber Engineering

The Scottish Institute for Policing Research (SIPR), a collaboration between Police Scotland, the Scottish Police Authority, and 14 Scottish universities is currently hosted by Edinburgh Napier University.

In September 2018, Edinburgh Napier partnered with Blockpass, a blockchain-based self-sovereign identity protocol, to launch the Blockpass Identity Lab (BIL) - a research lab focused around cryptography and blockchain technology. The lab is intended to lead to the development of various blockchain applications for use in identity solutions.

In 2023 the university has partnered with the then Wavegarden Scotland (now Lost Shore) — Scottish first inland surf resort to set up The SurfLab for academic research in surf therapy, high-performance surfing and equipment testing.

== Student life ==
Edinburgh Napier Students' Association (ENSA) is the university's students' union. The main office is located on Merchiston Campus, with satellite offices on both Craiglockhart and Sighthill campuses. ENSA is represented by three elected student Co-Presidents. The ENSA Union Bar is located above the Three Sisters bar in the Cowgate, Edinburgh.

The Students' Association is a fully constituted, independent association providing student representation and a free, confidential academic and welfare advice service, as well as supporting a variety of cultural societies and sports clubs. Students can apply for paid employment as a Student Ambassador on a zero-hour contract, as long as the student has at least one year left on their degree.

The student newspaper, Veritas, is no longer published. It was founded as a tabloid newspaper in 1993 by Neil McIntosh.

== Midwifery programme ==
In April 2022, a "Skills Workbook", published by the university's midwifery programme and used to educate students, was leaked to the website Reduxx. The workbook dealt with catheterisation, and told students "while most times the pregnant or birthing person will have female genitalia, you may be caring for a person who has transitioned from male to female and may therefore still have external male genitalia".

In response to the claims made by the university's workbook, Elaine Miller, a Fellow of the Chartered Society of Physiotherapy, stated "it is not possible for a male person to get pregnant". Dr. Susan Bewley, Professor Emeritus in Obstetrics and Women's Health at King's College London called the materials "puzzling", and further stated "The writers seem to have left school remarkably ignorant of basic biology, sex, and anatomy".

The University immediately confirmed the materials had been corrected and stated: "Edinburgh Napier University is committed to upholding the professional standards required of us by the NMC, in particular 'The Code: Professional standards of practice and behaviour for nurses, midwives and nursing associates' (NMC, 2018), and the 'Standards for pre-registration midwifery programmes' (NMC, 2019), and wish to be inclusive of all people, including those who identify within the LGBTQ+ communities."

== Notable people ==
Arts
- Kaberi Gain, Bengali author and social activist
- David Hamilton, tenor
- El Mafrex, singer-songwriter

Media

- Martin W. Angler, science journalist
- Alan Fisher, journalist, senior correspondent at Al Jazeera English
- Amanda Hamilton, broadcaster
- Carol Kirkwood, BBC weather forecaster
- Neil McIntosh, journalist with The Wall Street Journal
- Arusa Qureshi, author
- Catriona Shearer, BBC Reporting Scotland presenter
- Gordon Smart, journalist and show business editor at The Sun
- Jim White, sports news presenter for Sky Sports News and Talk Sport radio

Politics

- John Andrew Barrett, former Scottish Liberal Democrat MP
- Jayne Baxter, Labour party politician
- Jim Dobbin, English former Labour MP
- Tom Harris, former Scottish Labour MP
- Graeme Morrice, former Labour Party MP
- Danielle Rowley, former Scottish Labour MP
- Alex Salmond, former First Minister of Scotland and Alba Party MP
- Tavish Scott, former Scottish Liberal Democrat MSP

Sports

- Peter Hoffmann, author, athlete, fencer
- Jamie Mayer, rugby player
- Lynsey Sharp, GB Olympian (800m) finalist
- Kyle Traynor, rugby player
- Bruce Mouat, curler, world silver medallist
- Beth Riva, bowls mixed pairs world champion

Other

- Paolo Buoni, promoter of Renewable Energy technologies in Europe; Founder of the Renewable Energy Institute
- Moray Callum, Scottish automotive designer
- David Eustace, photographer and former Chancellor at Edinburgh Napier University
- Neil Poulton, industrial designer
- Lawrence Ho, businessman, CEO of Melco International

== See also ==
- Armorial of UK universities
- Fresh Air (Edinburgh)
- List of universities in the United Kingdom
- Universities in Scotland
