= Adam Spreadbury-Maher =

Australian theatre director

- Born: Australia
- Occupations: Theatre director, producer and writer

Adam Spreadbury-Maher is an Australian/Irish theatre artistic director, producer and writer. He is the founding artistic director of the Cock Tavern Theatre, OperaUpClose and The Hope Theatre, and was artistic director of the Kings Head until 2021 King's Head Theatre. Spreadbury-Maher introduced the first unionised pay agreement for actors in a pub-theatre in 2011, and in 2017 introduced the first fringe creative pay agreement and gender policy.

== Biography ==
Spreadbury-Maher was born in Australia. He received his initial training as an opera singer at the Canberra School of Music. His debut directorial production of Jonathan Harvey's Beautiful Thing won Spreadbury-Maher an Australian Critics' Circle Award in 2004. In 2005 Adam moved to the UK, and attended London's Central School of Speech and Drama before making his London directing debut at White Bear Theatre, directing three critically successful shows as the theatre's Associate Director, including the two world premieres The Ides of March by Duncan Ley and Studies for a Portrait by Daniel Reitz. Studies for a Portrait transferred to the Oval House Theatre following its critics' choice sell-out run at the White Bear Theatre. In 2008 Spreadbury-Maher directed Australian actor Mark Little in a production of Così by Louis Nowra. Other early notable productions include the first UK revival of Peter Gill's The York Realist, presented at Riverside Studios to mark Gill's 70th birthday.

In 2010, Spreadbury-Maher was Associate Director on the UK premiere of the multi-award-winning Holding the Man, adapted by Tommy Murphy and based on the novel by Timothy Conigrave. Further 2010 directing work included the UK premiere of Hannie Rayson's landmark Australian play Hotel Sorrento, the rarely revived first play of Peter Gill's The Sleepers Den, the world premiere of Edward Bond's There Will Be More, and ended 2010 with his operatic directing debut in a new version of "Madama Butterfly" retitled "Bangkok Butterfly", which he adapted into English for OperaUpClose. The production ran for four months at King's Head Theatre, garnishing critical notice from Fiona Maddocks in The Observer, "Madam Butterfly has been updated to Bangkok Butterfly to chilling effect... full of promise and musically intelligent." and Michael Tanner in The Spectator, "Beautiful and sexy... the evening was a powerful one".

=== King's Head Theatre ===
In March 2010, Spreadbury-Maher was appointed Artistic Director of King's Head Theatre. Spreadbury-Maher has transferred work from the King's Head Theatre to the West End, Australia and Off-Broadway. In 2011 he introduced the first unionised pay agreement for actors in an unfunded pub theatre, which was followed by the first creatives pay agreement and gender policy in 2017.

=== Cock Tavern Theatre and OperaUpClose ===
In 2009, Adam founded the Cock Tavern Theatre and OperaUpClose, becoming the company's founding Artistic Director. Under his leadership the theatre followed a strict artistic policy of staging only world premiers and revivals from world class playwrights and composers, a strategy which saw the theatre praised for its imaginative programming and quality productions. At the Cock Tavern Theatre, Adam directed revivals by Stephen Fry, Nick Ward, Hannie Rayson and produced a six-decade retrospective season of work by Edward Bond, including London, UK and World premieres, and a production of The Fool directed by Bond himself.

December 2009 saw Spreadbury-Maher form OperaUpClose with the aim of bringing opera to a wider audience by producing new, classic and difficult pieces which have so far been neglected or previously inaccessible. Adam, alongside Ben Cooper, produced La Boheme, directed by Robin Norton Hale, which was extended at Cock Tavern Theatre for six months following a sell-out run and significant critical acclaim, and which had a six-week sell-out season in July 2011, at the Soho Theatre, and returned for a further six-week season in January 2011. The production represents the longest running continuously performed La Bohème in its history. Spreadbury-Maher appointed OperaUpClose his resident company when he took over as Artistic Director of the King's Head Theatre in 2010, producing regularly from the Islington base, including a landmark production of Monteverdi's Coronation of Poppea directed in a new version by Mark Ravenhill with additional musical material by Michael Nyman; the production was awarded five-stars by London's Evening Standard and starred Rebecca Caine. Spreadbury-Maher directed new productions of A Masked Ball and Tosca for OperaUpClose (in his own new English versions) the latter in a co-production with Malmö Opera, which transferred to London's Soho Theatre. His Artistic Directorship of OperaUpClose ended in January 2013.

Spreadbury-Maher was awarded the Fringe Report Award 2010 for Best Artistic Director as recognition of the success at the Cock. Mark Shenton of The Stage awarded The Cock Tavern the Dan Crawford Peter Brook Award in 2009, nine months after being opened by Spreadbury-Maher. The venue permanently closed in April 2011 following a council inspection which revealed the lack of the correct performance license.

=== Hope Theatre ===
Spreadbury-Maher founded the Hope Theatre in October 2013 on the first floor of the historic Hope and Anchor in Islington, a short distance from the King's Head Theatre. The 50-seat theatre was set up as an experiment to demonstrate that actors could be paid in smaller fringe spaces, and was the first off-West End venue to open with an Equity agreement. During his time as Artistic Director, Spreadbury programmed the first production of Ushers the Front of House Musical which later transferred to the Arts Theatre. His last production as Artistic Director was the world premiere of Joe Orton's first play Fred & Madge, directed by his former assistant and protege Mary Franklin. Adam's tenure as Artistic Director earned him a place on The Stage newspaper's coveted Stage 100 list. The Hope Theatre continues to operate and has maintained Spreadbury's founding policy of paying actors and stage management at all times.

== Awards ==
=== Winner ===
- 2016 Offie for Best Opera Production - Cosi Fan Tutte at King's Head Theatre
- The Laurence Olivier Awards – Best New Opera for La Bohème at Soho Theatre, 2011
- What's on Stage.com Awards – Best Off-West End Production for La bohème at The Cock Tavern Theatre, 2011
- London Fringe Report Awards – Best Artistic Director, 2010
- Peter Brook… Empty Space Awards – Dan Crawford Innovation Award awarded to Cock Tavern Theatre, 2009
- Australian Critics' Circle Award for Jonathan Harvey's Beautiful Thing, 2004

=== Nominations ===
- What's on Stage.com Awards – Best off-West End production for Richard O'Brien's Shock Treatment at the King's Head Theatre, 2015
- Peter Brook… Empty Space Awards – Mark Marvin Rent Subsidy nomination for OperaUpClose at the King's Head Theatre, 2011
- What's on Stage.com Awards – Theatre Event of The Year for King's Head Theatre transformation in London's Little Opera House, 2011
- 2011 Offie for Best Director - Così by Louis Nowra at the King's Head Theatre.
- Peter Brook... Empty Space Awards – Mark Marvin Rent Subsidy Award for OperaUpClose at the King's Head Theatre, 2011

== Work ==
=== As a director ===
- Coming Clean by Kevin Elyot (25 July 2017 – 26 August 2017) King's Head Theatre, London
- La bohème by Giacomo Puccini (31 August 2016 – 8 October 2016) King's Head Theatre, London
- Strangers in Between by Tommy Murphy (21 June 2016 – 16 July 2016) King's Head Theatre, London
- Trainspotting by Irvine Welsh adapted by Harry Gibson (17 March 2015 – 11 April 2015) King's Head Theatre, London
- Dead Party Animals by Thomas Pickles (1 May 2014 – 24 May 2014) The Hope Theatre, London
- A Tale of Two Cities by Charles Dickens adapted by Terence Rattigan and John Gielgud (25 September 2013 – 19 October 2013) King's Head Theatre, London
- A Masked Ball by Giuseppe Verdi (14 April 2013 – 25 May 2013) King's Head Theatre, London
- Tosca by Giacomo Puccini (2 October 2012 – 10 November 2012) King's Head Theatre, London
- Tosca by Giacomo Puccini (8 September 2012 – 2 December 2012) Malmö Opera, Sweden
- Denial by Arnold Wesker (15 May 2012 – 9 June 2012) King's Head Theatre, London
- Così by Louis Nowra (19 June 2011 – 13 July 2011) King's Head Theatre, London
- Madama Butterfly (or Bangkok Butterfly) by Giacomo Puccini (11 December 2010 – 30 March 2011) King's Head Theatre, London
- There Will Be More by Edward Bond (26 October 2010 – 13 November 2010) The Cock Tavern Theatre, London
- The Sleepers Den by Peter Gill (27 September 2010 – 16 October 2010) Riverside Studios, London
- Hotel Sorrento by Hannie Rayson (19 August 2010 – 11 September 2010) The Cock Tavern Theatre, London
- Studies for a Portrait by Daniel Reitz (30 March 2010 – 23 May 2010 – revival) King's Head Theatre, London
- The York Realist by Peter Gill (23 September 2009 – 11 October 2009) Riverside Studios, London
- The Present by Nick Ward (20 August 2009 – 5 September 2009) The Cock Tavern Theatre, London
- Latin! or Tobacco and Boys by Stephen Fry (23 June – 11 July 2009) The Cock Tavern Theatre, London
- Studies for a Portrait by Daniel Reitz (19 May 2008 – 13 June 2008 – revival) Oval House, London
- Studies for a Portrait by Daniel Reitz (9 January 2008 – 1 February 2008) White Bear Theatre, London
- The Ides of March by Duncan Ley (25 November 2008 – 21 December 2008) White Bear Theatre, London
- Così by Louis Nowra (29 July 2008 – 24 August 2008) White Bear Theatre, London
- Boom Bang-a-Bang by Jonathan Harvey (16 June 2005 – 3 July 2004) Canberra Theatre, Canberra
- Beautiful Thing by Jonathan Harvey (8 January 2004 – 24 January 2004) Street Theatre, Canberra

=== Theatre – artistic director ===
- Vieux Carré by Tennessee Williams (14 August 2012 – 1 September 2012) Charing Cross Theatre, London
- Vieux Carré by Tennessee Williams (10 July 2012 – 4 August 2012) King's Head Theatre, London
- Someone to Blame by Tess Berry-Hart (6 March 2012 – 31 March 2012) King's Head Theatre, London
- Così by Louis Nowra (19 June 2011 – 13 July 2011) King's Head Theatre, London
- A Cavalier for Milady by Tennessee Williams (7 June 2011 – 25 June 2011) Jermyn Street Theatre, London
- A Butcher of Distinction by Rob Hayes (3–5 April 2011) The Cock Tavern Theatre, London
- A Cavalier for Milady by Tennessee Williams (29 March 2011 – 1 April 2011) The Cock Tavern Theatre, London
- I Never Get Dressed Till After Dark on Sundays by Tennessee Williams (1–26 March 2011) The Cock Tavern Theatre, London
- Judith: A Parting from the Body by Howard Barker (7–26 February 2011) The Cock Tavern Theatre, London
- It's Raining in Barcelona by Pau Miró (9 January 2011 – 29 January 2011) The Cock Tavern Theatre, London
- Subs by R. J. Purdy (4 January 2011 – 29 January 2011) The Cock Tavern Theatre, London
- Pins and Needles by Harold Rome (16 November – 11 December 2010) The Cock Tavern Theatre, London
- Over Gardens Out by Peter Gill (19 October 2010 – 6 November 2010) Riverside Studios, London
- The Sleepers Den by Peter Gill (27 September 2010 – 16 October 2010) Riverside Studios, London
- Red, Black and Ignorant by Edward Bond (31 October – 13 November 2010) The Cock Tavern Theatre, London
- There Will Be More by Edward Bond (26 October – 13 November 2010) The Cock Tavern Theatre, London
- The Fool by Edward Bond (10–23 October 2010) The Cock Tavern Theatre, London
- The Under Room by Edward Bond (5–24 October 2010) The Cock Tavern Theatre, London
- The Pope's Wedding by Edward Bond (19 September – 2 October 2010) The Cock Tavern Theatre, London
- Olly's Prison by Edward Bond (14 September – 2 October 2010) The Cock Tavern Theatre, London
- Hotel Sorrento by Hannie Rayson (17 August 2010 – 11 September 2010) The Cock Tavern Theatre, London
- Subs by R. J. Purdy (25 July 2010 – 7 September 2010) The Cock Tavern Theatre, London
- A Stretch of the Imagination by Jack Hibberd (16 June 2010 – 17 July 2010) The Cock Tavern Theatre, London
- Swing by Jamie Harper and Dan Muirden (23 May 2010 – 12 June 2010) The Cock Tavern Theatre, London
- A Model for Mankind by James Sheldon (27 March 2010 – 17 April 2010) The Cock Tavern Theatre, London
- Nightsongs by Jon Fosse (30 January 2010 – 20 February 2010) The Cock Tavern Theatre, London
- The York Realist by Peter Gill (23 September 2009 – 11 October 2009) Riverside Studios, London
- Brooklyn by Rose Martula (8 September 2009 – 26 September 2009) The Cock Tavern Theatre, London
- Last Drinks by Duncan Ley (23 June 2009 – 11 July 2009) The Cock Tavern Theatre, London
- The Backroom by Adrian Pagan (12 March 2009 – 11 April 2009) The Cock Tavern Theatre, London

=== Opera – artistic director ===
- Carmen by Georges Bizet dir. Rodula Gaitanou (3 April 2012 – 5 May 2012) King's Head Theatre, London
- La fanciulla del West by Giacomo Puccini dir. Robert Chevara (31 January 2012 – 3 March 2012) King's Head Theatre, London
- Don Giovanni by Wolfgang Amadeus Mozart dir. Robin Norton-Hale (11 August 2011 – 17 September 2011) Soho Theatre, London
- The Turn of the Screw by Benjamin Britten dir. Edward Dick (1 July 2011 – Current) King's Head Theatre, London
- The Coronation of Poppea by Claudio Monteverdi dir. Mark Ravenhill (5 April 2011 – 31 August 2011) King's Head Theatre, London
- La Boheme by Giacomo Puccini, dir. Robin Norton-Hale (1 March 2011 – Current) King's Head Theatre, London
- Pagliacci by Ruggero Leoncavallo dir. Anna Gregory (24 February 2011 – 31 May 2011) King's Head Theatre, London
- La Bohème by Giacomo Puccini, dir. Robin Norton-Hale (11 January 2011 – 19 February 2011) Soho Theatre, London
- Cinderella by Gioachino Rossini dir. Emma Rivlin (11 December 2010 – 23 January 2011) King's Head Theatre, London
- Madama Butterfly (or Bangkok Butterfly) by Giacomo Puccini dir. Adam Spreadbury-Maher (11 December 2010 – 30 March 2011) King's Head Theatre, London
- The Barber of Seville (or Salisbury) by Gioachino Rossini, dir. Robin Norton-Hale (5 October 2010 – 13 November 2010) King's Head Theatre, London
- La Bohème by Giacomo Puccini, dir. Robin Norton-Hale (27 July 2010 – 4 September 2010) Soho Theatre, London
- La Bohème by Giacomo Puccini, dir. Robin Norton-Hale (8 December 2009 – 15 May 2010) The Cock Tavern Theatre, London

=== As a translator ===
- Tosca by Giacomo Puccini (2 October 2012 – 10 November 2012) King's Head Theatre, London
- Tosca composed by Giacomo Puccini (8 September 2012 – 2 December 2012) Malmö Opera House, Sweden
- Madama Butterfly (or Bangkok Butterfly) composed by Giacomo Puccini (11 December 2010 – 30 March 2011) King's Head Theatre, London
