= Latin! or Tobacco and Boys =

Play by Stephen Fry

- Poster by David Lewis for the 1980 Edinburgh Festival Fringe production
- Original language: English
- Written by: Stephen Fry
- Subject: pederastic and sado-masochisitic sexuality in a boys' school
- Genre: comedy
- Setting: Chartham Park Preparatory School For Boys

Premiere
- Date: 1979
- Place: The Playroom at Corpus Christi College, Cambridge.

Latin! or Tobacco and Boys is a 1979 British play written by Stephen Fry. It is about life at the fictional Chartham Park Preparatory School For Boys, a prep school in England, and ends up in Morocco, via a pederastic relationship between a teacher and a 13-year-old schoolboy.

The title derives from Christopher Marlowe's claim, reported by Richard Baines, that "All they that love not Tobacco and Boys are fools".

It was commissioned for 'The Playroom', a theatre in St Edward's Passage, Cambridge, then run by Corpus Christi students. The author was given as 'Sue Denim'. Fry, then an undergraduate at Queens' College, Cambridge, took the part of the younger schoolmaster.

The text was included in Paperweight, a collection of writings by Fry, published in 1992.

== Characters ==
=== Central characters ===
Only two characters actually appear on stage:

- Dominic Clarke: a Latin schoolmaster in his mid-twenties — a character known for his "sharp voice when teaching, but younger one when engaged in normal conversation".
- Herbert Brookshaw: a schoolmaster in his late fifties.

=== Pupils in Dominic's Latin class ===
These are referred to as if present, but their role is taken by the audience:

- Rupert Cartwright: a semi-central character, a pupil in Dominic's Latin class.
- Barton-Mills
- Catchpole
- Elwyn-Jones
- Figgis
- Harvey-Williams
- Hoskins (deceased)
- Hughes
- Kinnock
- Madison
- Potter
- Smethwick
- Spragg
- Standfast
- Whitwell

== Plot ==
While the audience is walking in, a teacher (Dominic) is seen on stage marking exercise books "with three different coloured biros". When the audience sits, the play starts. Dominic addresses the pupils (played by the audience), and after yelling at them, starts teaching, until Brookshaw enters.

After the boys have supposedly left the room, Brookshaw enters. He explains to Dominic that he has been adding up merit-points accumulated by pupils, taking over the job for the headmaster while the latter is sick, and has noticed that one boy, Cartwright, has gained an enormous number of merits. Brookshaw then explains that he knows the reason for these excessive merits. It turns out that Dominic has been taking Cartwright for "extra Latin periods" in which Dominic engages in sexual liaison with the 13-year-old Cartwright. The headmaster's daughter has seen what has been going on. Dominic admits to this, and says that making love with Cartwright is the only way in which he can feel young.

Brookshaw says that he won't tell anyone about the illicit affair if Dominic sends all of his naughty pupils to Brookshaw himself, instead of to the headmaster, to be beaten; and secondly, if Dominic will beat him for two days a week with a wet towel and other curious objects.

When the boys' Common Entrance Examination results are announced, Cartwright's score is curiously high amidst the general mediocrity of the class, and Brookshaw recognises that Cartwright's test paper has been corrected by Dominic. As a result, Dominic is forced to leave the school.

Later, Brookshaw is serving as acting headmaster while the headmaster is sick. He reads a letter to the assembly from "Ghanim Ibn Mahmud" and "Abu Hassan Basim", Arabic names adopted by Dominic and Cartwright. It turns out that Dominic and Cartwright have become Muslims; they now live in Morocco, and Dominic has adopted Cartwright. After the assembly, Brookshaw starts writing a reply to the letter, and the play ends.

=== Chartham merit-adding system ===
The Chartham merit-adding system is the system in which boys are commended or censured, and are rewarded or punished as a result. If a boy is good, he gets a merit; if he is very good, he gets a "plus", if he gets 3 pluses, he gets "free tuck" (which means free food). Then, if the boy does very well in all fields, and shows "initiative far beyond his age", he gets a star, worth 25 points, and a £5 "tuck token". The opposites of these things respectively are the demerit, the "minus" (if a boy gets 3 minuses, the boy gets no tuck at all), and the "black hole" (minus 25 points, "offender eats crap, is caned; ritually kicked out by headmaster every morning").

== Style ==
The play is known for its sexual explicitness, something of a trait of Stephen Fry's earlier writings. This type of writing is also seen in Fry's 1991 book The Liar.

== Critical reception ==
The play was well received when it played at the 1980 Edinburgh Festival Fringe, and it won the Fringe First prize.

Mark Cook of Time Out magazine said that it was a "chuckle provoking piece", whereas Kieron Quirke of The Observer said that it was a play written by "a clever 22-year-old seeing how many times he can say 'bum' and still be taken seriously".

== Edinburgh Festival Fringe ==
For the 1980 Edinburgh Festival Fringe, Latin! was performed at Riddle's Court, Royal Mile, by the Cambridge University Mummers. The dates were 18–23 and 25–30 August 1980, at 5.15 p.m., tickets costing 90p. It was part of a double bill, the other play being written by Robert Farrar, then a fellow-undergraduate. It was directed by Simon Cherry, with Stephen Fry playing Clarke, and John Davies, a law undergraduate at Cambridge, playing Brookshaw. The Cambridge Mummers' programme of five works won a Fringe First prize.

== Revivals ==
The play has had many revivals, including at the Burton Taylor Studio in central Oxford, King's Head Theatre, Islington (2002), The Cock Tavern Theatre in Kilburn, and The Everyman Theatre of Canberra (Australia). The 2009 revival at The Cock Tavern Theatre was directed by Adam Spreadbury-Maher.

== See also ==
- Greek love, the philosophic underpinning of this sort of teacher-pupil relationship
