= Paperweight (book) =

1992 writing collection by Stephen Fry

- Author: Stephen Fry
- Language: English
- Publication date: 1992
- Publication place: United Kingdom

Paperweight is a collection of writings by Stephen Fry, first published in the United Kingdom in 1992.

The book contains a wide selection of Fry's journalism, including comment pieces, reviews and criticism.

There are transcripts of several radio performances, including 22 appearances from BBC Radio 4's Loose Ends show in the character of eccentric Cambridge philologist Professor Donald Trefusis, who appeared as a major character in Fry's first novel, The Liar (1991).

The book also includes the script of a play, Latin! or Tobacco and Boys, an early work by Fry set in a prep school in England, which won the "Fringe First" prize at the Edinburgh Festival in 1980. It had a 2009 revival with performances opening on 23 June at The Cock Tavern Theatre in London, directed by Adam Spreadbury-Maher.
