= OperaUpClose =

Opera company in the UK

OperaUpClose is a national touring opera company, led by Artistic Director Flora McIntosh, The company was founded in 2009 to produce its début production, Robin Norton-Hale's Olivier Award-winning adaptation of Puccini's La bohème at The Cock Tavern Theatre.

OperaUpClose produce new English language versions of the standard repertoire and World Premieres of new operas. Of the standard works, La bohème stands out as having been successful in runs for extended periods and has transferred to a West End location. Since being founded in 2009, OperaUpClose has produced thirty-eight operas: including six world premieres of contemporary operas, classic operas in newly commissioned chamber orchestrations and English librettos. Their production of La Bohème won the 2011 Olivier Award for Best Opera Production and the WhatsOnStage.com Award for Best Off-West End production; and their world premiere of The Blank Canvas received the 2015 Offie for Best Opera.

Between 2010 and 2015, OperaUpClose was the resident company at The King's Head Theatre in Islington. From that date "the company will work in a variety of larger venues in London, including Kings Place, Soho Theatre and Tricycle Theatre, and further develop its touring output across the UK." The company is an Associate Company of Soho Theatre and co-produces with the Belgrade Theatre Coventry, Tricycle Theatre, Kings Place and Malmö Opera (Sweden).

In 2014 OperaUpClose began operating as a charity. The company ended its residency at the King's Head Theatre in 2015. In April 2023 OperaUpClose joined Arts Council England National Funding Portfolio.

== La bohème ==
La bohème opened on 8 December 2009 and ran for five months, making it the longest-running continuously performed production of that opera. The production was noted for its relocation of the audience to the pub area of The Cock Tavern for the second act, described by George Hall in The Guardian as "a masterstroke to transfer the Café Momus scene downstairs – to the bar – where it becomes impossible to be sure who is a member of the chorus and who is an innocent bystander having a drink."

The OperaUpClose La bohème transferred to the Soho Theatre for a 6-week run from 27 July 2010 (followed by a further 6-week run in January/February 2011) and was the first opera to play at the theatre. The production won the 2011 Olivier Award for best new opera production. and the 2011 Whatsonstage.com Awards for Best Off-West End Production. La bohème was revived in 2012 for a 3-month run at the Charing Cross Theatre, at the Ravenna Festival in Italy in 2014 and continues to tour.

== 2015 season onwards ==
In 2015 OperaUpClose presented the world premiere of Unborn in America by composer Luke Styles and librettist Peter Cant, as part of the Vault Festival; revived their production of Verdi's La Traviata at Tricycle Theatre; opened a new production of Bizet's Carmen at Soho Theatre; presented the World Premiere of Anthony Young and Leanna Brodie's family opera Ulla's Odyssey at Kings Place; and continued to tour the UK with their production of Mozart's The Marriage of Figaro.

In 2016 OperaUpClose created their first education and participation programme. Partnering with Theatre in Education company, Big Wheel, and funded by Arts Council England, they created a series of workshops that tour with their children's opera, Ulla's Odyssey.

== Past productions outside the standard repertory ==
- Manifest Destiny by Keith Burstein, directed by Valentina Ceschi at King's Head Theatre (2011)
- The Turn of the Screw by Benjamin Britten, directed by Edward Dick at King's Head Theatre (2011)
- L'incoronazione di Poppea by Claudio Monteverdi, directed by Mark Ravenhill at King's Head Theatre (2011)
- La Fanciulla del West by Giacomo Puccini, directed by Robert Chevara at King's Head Theatre (2012)
- Two Caravans by Guy Harries, directed by Vincent van den Elshout at King's Head Theatre (2013)
- The Blank Canvas (World premiere) by Spyros Syrmos, directed by Lucy Bradley at King's Head Theatre (2014)
- Dido and Aeneas by Henry Purcell, directed by Valentina Caschi at King's Head Theatre (2014)
- Young Wife (World première) by Katarzyna Brochocka, directed by Robin Norton-Hale at King's Head Theatre (2014)
- Unborn in America (World premiere) created by composer Luke Styles and director-librettist Peter Cant, presented by Ensemble Amorpha and OperaUpClose at the Vault Festival (2015)

== Flourish ==
Flourish is OperaUpClose's opera writing competition, supported by Arts Council England. The competition aims to provide a platform for emerging and established composers and librettists, and to raise awareness of contemporary opera. The winning opera is produced in full by OperaUpClose. Previous judges have included Mark Ravenhill, Opera Holland Park producer James Clutton, Glyn Maxwell, Robert Saxton, Imogen Tilden, Luke Styles, Anna Pickard and Clare Presland.

The 2012 winner was Two Caravans by composer Guy Harries and librettist Ace McCarron. The 2013 winner, The Blank Canvas, was written by composer Spyros Syrmos from a libretto by Fay Wrixon. Ulla's Odyssey by composer Anthony Young and librettist Leanna Brodie won in 2014.

Last year's winner, They Came Back, tells the stories of five individuals struggling to come to terms with dead people returning to life.
