= Good Night Out Presents =

UK theatre company

Good Night Out Presents was one of the resident theatre companies at The Cock Tavern Theatre in London.

== History ==
Good Night Out Presents was formed in August 2008 and moved to The Cock Tavern Theatre following a residency at The White Bear Theatre. The company received its first transfer when Studies for a Portrait, directed by Adam Spreadbury-Maher transferred for a month-long run at the Oval House Theatre. A revised production of Studies for a Portrait opened at The King's Head Theatre in March 2010 for an 8-week run and featured music by Boy George written specifically for the production.

Other productions from Good Night Out Presents included Adrian Pagan’s The Backroom, revived at The Cock Tavern Theatre for the first time since the play’s premiere at the Bush Theatre in 1999. Additionally, the ensemble had formed a relationship with Nick Ward, the theater's resident playwright. Ward's The Present was revived at The Cock Tavern Theatre under the guidance of the playwright in 2009.

The Good Night Presents was dissolved on May 17 2016.
