= Stephanie Crawford =

Stephanie Crawford may refer to:

- Miss Stephanie Crawford, fictional character in To Kill a Mockingbird
- Stephanie Sinclaire (1954–2021), also known as Stephanie Crawford, director, writer, and film-maker
