= The York Realist =

2001 play by Peter Gill

The York Realist is a 2001 play by Peter Gill. It was premiered at the Lowry in November 2001 before moving to the Bristol Old Vic and the Royal Court Theatre in January 2002 by English Touring Theatre, with Gill himself directing. It transferred to the Strand Theatre in March 2002.

== Plot ==
It is set in the early 1960s and revolves around George (a Yorkshire farm labourer involved in a production of the York Mystery Plays who withdraws from the production), John (the production's shy assistant director who tries to convince him to come back), the love affair between them, and the clash between regional and London culture.

== Reception ==
Reviews of the original production ranged from "a rare blast of reality", which was "adventurous, witty and fresh", (The Guardian) to a "stunningly boring slab of dour social realism" (the Telegraph).

The play was nominated for Best New Play at the Olivier Awards and Evening Standard Theatre Awards and won the Critics Circle Award for Best New Play.

== Original cast ==
- George - Lloyd Owen
- John - Richard Coyle
- George and Barbara's Mother - Anne Reid
- Barbara - Caroline O'Neill
- Arthur - Ian Mercer
- Doreen - Wendy Nottingham
- Jack - Felix Bell

=== Creative Team ===
- Director - Peter Gill
- Designer - William Dudley
- Lighting Designer - Hartley T A Kemp
- Composer - Terry Davies
- Assistant Director - Josie Rourke
- Dialect Coach - Jeanette Nelson

== Revivals ==
The play was revived in October 2009 at Riverside Studios by Good Night Out Presents. The production received positive reviews, with Michael Billington describing the production as "lovingly revived by Adam Spreadbury-Maher" (the Guardian). The production was seen as particularly fitting given that Gill founded the Riverside Studios in 1975, and that this would be the first Gill production at the theatre for 30 years. The play was revived in September 2009 at the Riverside Studios by the company Good Night Out Presents, to mark Gill's 70th birthday. It was revived again in February 2018 at the Donmar Warehouse.

Role
Role	Oct 2009 Riverside Studios	Feb 2018 Donmar Warehouse
George	Stephen Hagan	Ben Batt
John	Matthew Burton	Jonathan Bailey
George and Barbara's Mother	Stephanie Fayerman	Lesley Nicol
Barbara	Fiona Gordon	Lucy Black
Arthur	Sam Hazeldine	Matthew Wilson
Doreen	Sarah Waddell	Katie West
Jack	Jack Blumeneau	Brian Fletcher

=== Riverside Studios Creative Team ===
- Director - Adam Spreadbury-Maher
- Designer - Kate Guinness
- Costume Designer - Mia Thomson
- Lighting Designer - Steve Lowe

=== Donmar Warehouse Creative Team ===
- Director - Robert Hastie
- Set and Costume Designer - Peter McKintosh
- Lighting Designer - Paul Pyant
- Sound Designer - Emma Laxton
- Composer - Richard Taylor
