= Duncan Ley =

Australian playwright and actor

Duncan Ley is an Australian playwright, actor, theatrical producer and director who has also written for Sydney's Motion Picture Company. His play In Cold Light is currently in the production phase as it is turned into a feature film by Peter Slee Productions. Duncan was a founding member of Canberra's Everyman Theatre.

== Career ==
=== Playwright Credits ===
Ley's plays including Home At The End, The Burning, When in Rome, In Cold Light, For All Our Sins, Final Passages, Pillock for the Defence, The Suspect, and Last Drinks. The Ides of March made its world premiere at The White Bear Theatre in Kennington on 28 November 2008, directed by Adam Spreadbury-Maher and starring British actress Robyn Moore best known for her portrayal as Shirley Benson on BBC's EastEnders.

In 2009, Ley's play Last Drinks was presented as a double bill with Stephen Fry's Latin.

=== Awards ===
Ley has won a number of awards, including for his direction of William Shakespeare's Hamlet for New Century Productions. He won "Best Original Work of the Year" and "Best Play of the Year" from the Canberra Area Theatre Awards in both 2001 and 2003, for The Burning and In Cold Light respectively. His play "The Ides of March" was short-listed for the 2007 STC Patrick White Playwright's Award.
