= Thaxter =

Thaxter is a surname. Notable people with the surname include:

- Celia Thaxter (1835–1894), American writer of poetry and stories
- Edward Thaxter Gignoux (1916–1988), United States federal judge
- John Thaxter (1927–2012), British theatre critic
- Phyllis Thaxter (1919–2012), American actress
- Roland Thaxter (1858–1932), American mycologist, the son of Celia Thaxter and Levi Thaxter
- Samuel Thaxter (1665–1740), colonel and magistrate in Plymouth, New England
- Sidney St. Felix Thaxter (1883–1958), justice of the Maine Supreme Judicial Court
- Winfred Thaxter Denison (1873–1919), United States Assistant Attorney General and Secretary of the Interior
