= English Touring Opera =

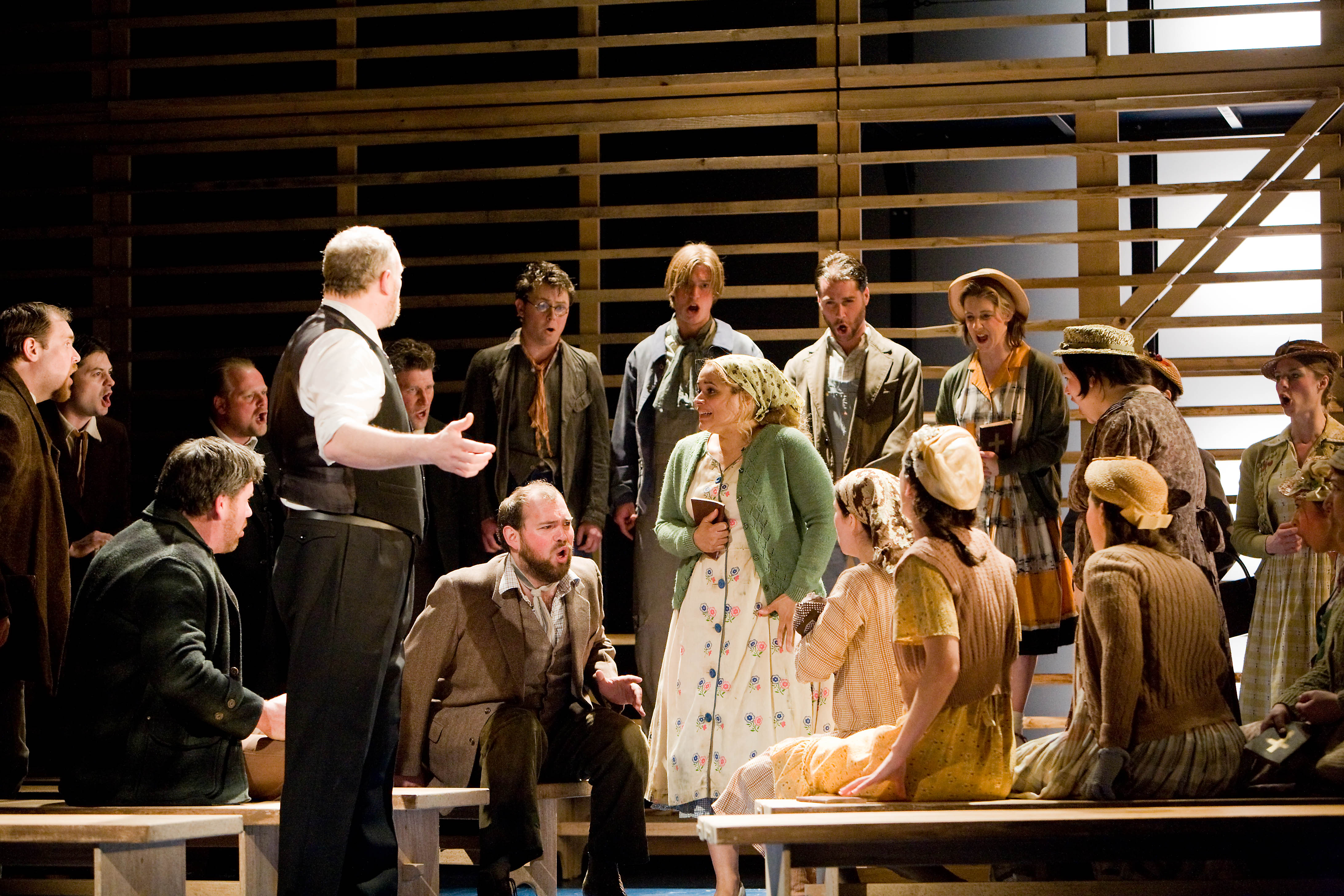
English Touring Opera Spring 2008 Production of Carlisle Floyd's Susannah

English Touring Opera (ETO) is an opera company in the United Kingdom founded in 1979 under the name Opera 80 by the then-existing Arts Council of Great Britain. The company changed to its present name in 1992.

== History ==
Opera 80 itself became the successor to Opera For All, an "umbrella organization" which had planned tours by small groups which performed to piano accompaniment. David Parry became music director in 1983.

ETO aims to introduce new audiences to opera and has an extensive outreach programme alongside its touring productions. The company targets towns and cities where performance infrastructure exists but there is little opera on stage. From 2002 to 2022, James Conway was director of ETO. Gerry Cornelius became music director of ETO in April 2021. Robin Norton-Hale became artistic director and chief executive officer of ETO in 2022.

=== 2021 dismissals ===
In September 2021, ETO wrote to tell 13 freelance musicians that they would not be re-engaged for the upcoming tour, but that they would stay in a pool of artists to be drawn upon in the future. Some of the players had been engaged in freelance contracts year after year. The players who were not engaged for the upcoming season were mid-to-late-career musicians, when sent the letter. The freelance artists had hoped to return to work in the post-pandemic period. Zhang Zhang, a violinist with the Monte-Carlo Philharmonic Orchestra, asked if firing people because of their skin colour is racism. Zoe Strimpel wrote that ETO's "policy race-based contracting" was a "debacle." ETO indicated its policy was based on guidance from its main funder, Arts Council England.

== Awards ==
In 2004, James Conway's production of A Midsummer Night's Dream was nominated for a Royal Philharmonic Society (RPS) "Best Opera" Award.

Conway's production of Donizetti's Maria Stuarda was nominated for a South Bank Show Award in 2005.

ETO's projects Ice and Crossing the Styx were both nominated for an RPS Award in the Education Category in 2006. Ice was a devised opera for teenagers, and Crossing the Styx was a devised opera for primary school students.

House on the Moon with the Wolverhampton Community Opera was nominated for an RPS Best Education Project award of 2007.

In 2010 One Day, Two Dawns with Hall for Cornwall won the RPS Education Award.

Laika the Spacedog, a new opera for children aged 7 to 11, was awarded the "David Bedford Music Education Award" in 2012. It honours outstanding music education projects, and was given by The PRS For Music Foundation. Laika the Spacedog also won two awards for Best Production at the Armel International Opera Festival in Szeged, Hungary in 2013. The Best Production award as voted for by the members of the International Competition Jury, and Best Production from the Jury of the University of Szeged.

In the Spring of 2014, ETO was the winner of an Olivier Award in the "Outstanding Achievement in Opera" category]; on the Olivier Awards website, it is noted that the company won the Award for "its brave and challenging touring productions....of Michael Tippett's elegant and vibrant King Priam and Britten's rarely performed operetta Paul Bunyan. The stylishly staged pair played at the Royal Opera House's Linbury Studio Theatre in Covent Garden, London, as part of a UK tour."
