= Heart of Darkness (opera) =

Opera by Tarik O'Regan

Heart of Darkness is a chamber opera in one act by Tarik O'Regan, with an English-language libretto by artist Tom Phillips, based on the 1899 novella of the same name by Joseph Conrad. It was first performed in a co-production by Opera East and ROH2 at the Linbury Theatre of the Royal Opera House in London on 1 November 2011 directed by Edward Dick. In May, 2015, the opera received its North American premiere in a production by Opera Parallèle, presented by Z Space in San Francisco, California.

== Background ==
The initial idea of adapting the Conrad novella into an opera stemmed from O'Regan's viewing the 2001 Redux version of the film Apocalypse Now (itself based on the book by Conrad) by Francis Ford Coppola. Work began in earnest in 2002 and passed through two development companies (American Opera Projects and the joint ROH2/Genesis Foundation initiative OperaGenesis) before it was premiered at the Royal Opera House.

In terms of its logistical approach, the opera was designed from the outset to be "short and small", but emotionally and dramatically large-scale. Writer and broadcaster Tom Service has described the creators' approach as "mirroring the disproportionate power of Conrad's slender book." O'Regan has stated that the opera adapts the novel by shifting the dramatic focus towards "the nature of storytelling" and the "preservation of secrecy".

The libretto by Tom Phillips uses only text from the novella and Conrad's Congo Diary. The opera's running time is 75 minutes and it requires an orchestra of 14. There are 12 singing roles, which can be performed by as few as 8 singers (as was done at the premiere production).

== Roles ==
Role	Voice type	Premiere cast, 1 November 2011 (conductor: Oliver Gooch)	San Francisco cast, May 2015 (conductor: Nicole Paiement)
Marlow	tenor	Alan Oke	Isaiah Bell
The Thames Captain	baritone	Njabulo Madlala	Daniel Cilli
The Company Secretary	tenor	Sipho Fubesi	Jonathan Smucker
The Doctor	bass-baritone	Donald Maxwell	Aleksey Bogdanov
The Accountant	tenor	Paul Hopwood	Michael Belle
The Manager	tenor	Sipho Fubesi	Jonathan Smucker
The Boilermaker	bass-baritone	Donald Maxwell	Aleksey Bogdanov
The Helmsman	tenor	Paul Hopwood	Michael Belle
Kurtz	bass	Morten Lassenius Kramp	Phillip Skinner
The Harlequin	tenor	Jaewoo Kim	Thomas Glenn
The River Woman	soprano	Gweneth-Ann Jeffers	Shawnette Sulker
The Fiancée	soprano	Gweneth-Ann Jeffers	Heidi Moss

=== Premiere production ===
Role	Premiere production team
Director	Edward Dick
Designer	Robert Innes Hopkins
Lighting Designer	Rick Fisher
Associate Director	Jane Gibson

=== Opera Parallèle San Francisco Production ===
Role	San Francisco production team
Director	Brian Staufenbiel
Production Designer	Brian Staufenbiel
Lighting Designer	Matthew Antaky
Media Designer	David Murakami
Costume Designer	Christine Crook
Wig/Makeup Designer	Jeanna Parham

=== Orchestral suite ===
A suite for orchestra and narrator was extrapolated from the opera and was given its London premiere by the Royal Philharmonic Orchestra and actor Samuel West in April, 2013.

== Synopsis ==
The opera opens with two snapshots: first Marlow, an old sea-captain, in a moment of recollection; next, a fragment of a mysterious encounter many years earlier, whose meaning only becomes clear at the end. The action takes place concurrently on a ship, moored in the Thames Estuary, and, many years earlier, during Marlow's expedition to Central Africa.

Instrumental prelude.

Marlow is among a small group of passengers aboard a ship moored in the Thames one evening, waiting for the tide to come in. He starts to relate the tale of his travels as a young man, when he sailed upriver in the equatorial forest of an unnamed country in Central Africa (which closely resembles the Congo Free State, a large area in Central Africa controlled by King Leopold II of Belgium from 1885-1908).

He has been sent there to find Kurtz, the enigmatic and once idealistic ivory trader rumoured to have turned his remote Inner Station into a barbaric fiefdom. Marlow's journey starts in the Company's offices in Europe, where he is given his instructions and a perfunctory medical check, before he departs for Africa.

He arrives first at the Downriver Station and encounters the Accountant who first mentions Kurtz. Marlow then comes to the Central Trading Station where he meets the Manager who will accompany him on the voyage. The expedition is delayed because the steamboat on which they will sail is damaged. Waiting for vital spare parts to arrive, Marlow befriends the boilermaker, who sheds more light on Kurtz.

Marlow finds a cryptic note dropped by the Manager, which hints at Kurtz's instability. The missing rivets arrive and the boat is fixed. The voyage progresses briskly, despite being attacked by unknown assailants. Eventually Marlow and his entourage arrive at the Inner Station, where Kurtz is based, together with his peculiar acolyte, the Harlequin. The Manager finds Kurtz's enormous hoard of ivory which he hurriedly carries on board the boat.

At last Kurtz appears. He is gaunt, thin and ill. He has a letter to give Marlow. A mysterious River Woman sings a lament.

The Harlequin reveals that it was Kurtz who ordered the attack on Marlow's steamboat. Marlow and Kurtz speak for the first time. Marlow sees Kurtz is on the edge of madness. He must be taken back downriver. On board the steamboat Kurtz becomes delirious, reflecting incoherently on his imperious ideas and deeds as the boat sails away from the Inner Station. Eventually Kurtz dies, uttering "The horror! The horror!"

Instrumental threnody.

We now witness in full the fragment of conversation seen at the start: back in London, Marlow meets Kurtz's fiancée to pass her the letter that Kurtz had entrusted to him. Despite all that he has seen and understood, Marlow is unable to bear witness to the truth. He is unable to tell her Kurtz's final words. We in turn see that Marlow himself has played his part in maintaining the secrecies of horror he finds so abhorrent.

Back on the Thames Estuary, the tide has risen. Marlow's tale is at an end. His isolation from the truth of his actions and the atrocities witnessed - that "vast grave of unspeakable secrets" in which he speaks of being "buried" - is borne out in his epilogue: "we live, as we dream, alone".

== Reception ==
The premiere production of Heart of Darkness opened to largely positive reviews, both in print and online.

Anna Picard described the opera as an "audacious, handsome debut" in The Independent on Sunday and Stephen Pritchard, in The Observer, explained that "the brilliance of [the] opera lies in its ability to convey all that horror without the compulsion to show it – the ultimate psychodrama – and to employ music of startling beauty to tell such a brutal tale". Pritchard also described the music as "a score of concise originality".

Jeanne Whalen in the Wall Street Journal thought the opera to be "very good" and went on to explain that "if you think of opera as an often bloated, over-wrought art form with hammy plots and acting, you would do well to try this one. It is elegant, moving, and, at just 75 minutes, short enough to allow time for dinner afterward". John Allison described the production as a "compellingly taut evening of music theatre" in The Sunday Telegraph.

Online, Opera Today described the opera as "a thrilling new work, in a brilliantly realised production", Classical Source thought it to be "a terrific new work, intelligently staged and magnificently performed" and Scene and Heard International thought the production to be "a well-crafted, well-executed work, which, whatever the future may hold, permits of not only a satisfying but at times moving evening in the theatre".

Although Rupert Christiansen in The Telegraph found the score to be "richly coloured and imaginative", he also found the production to be "dramatically flat". Christiansen concluded, however, that O'Regan "should be given another commission". Similarly, writing in The Guardian, George Hall thought "the score, though well managed, [didn't] fully seize its dramatic opportunities" but also commended the production as "swift and well paced, with no individual scene lasting longer than it should". Hall also thought that the music demonstrated "O'Regan's wide range of technical skills".

An extensive online piece by Michael White in The Daily Telegraph described the opera as "a landmark" and O'Regan as "one of the great hopes for British music in the 21st century". However, White also went on to describe the story-telling as "done with care and skill but without the sleight of hand required to sweep you through the missing bits." Nonetheless, White concluded by stating that the opera "has many virtues, and deserves performances".

The opera was listed in the end-of-year highlights of The Independent on Sunday and The Observer newspapers.

== Awards ==
Nominated in the Opera category for the South Bank Sky Arts Awards 2012
