= Robin Norton-Hale =

English theatre and opera director

- Education: Hertford College, Oxford
- Occupation: Theatre & Opera Director

Robin Norton-Hale is an English writer and director for opera and theatre. She is the Artistic Director of OperaUpClose, having founded the company alongside Adam Spreadbury-Maher and Ben Cooper in October 2009 and was previously Artist in Residence at Oxford Playhouse. She studied English Literature at Hertford College, Oxford and was a Clore Cultural Leadership Fellow (2013/14).

== Career ==
For OperaUpClose Norton-Hale has written new English librettos and directed productions including La Bohème (Soho Theatre, Cock Tavern Theatre and King's Head Theatre), winner of the 2011 Olivier Award for Best Opera, and Best Off-West End Production in the 2011 Whatsonstage.com Awards; a production of Carmen in partnerships with the End Violence Against Women Coalition ("radical... a gripping, thought-provoking achievement" WhatsOnStage); Mary, Queen of Scots in partnership with the National Trust ("superb" London Evening Standard) and in 2019, an original libretto for an opera for Early Years, created in partnership with composer Joanna Lee, based on Jill Murphy’s picture book Peace At Last. These productions have been seen in venues including Bristol Old Vic, Cast Doncaster, Northcott Exeter, Snape Maltings, Stephen Joseph Theatre Scarborough and Theatr Clwyd.

Other directing credits include Notes to the Forgotten She-Wolves (co-directed with Athena Stevens, Sam Wanamaker Playhouse), Redefining Juliet (Barbican), The Little Sweep and La Traviata (Malmo Opera, Sweden), Masters Are You Mad? by Glyn Maxwell (Grosvenor Park Open Air Theatre) and The Taming of the Shrew (Southwark Playhouse).

She has written new English versions of eight operas, including Eugene Onegin and The Marriage of Figaro. Her librettos for La Bohème and Don Giovanni are published by Oberon. Her play for young children, The Mince Pie Mice, was performed at the Lichfield Garrick in December 2021.
