= Tarik O'Regan: Threshold of Night =

2008 studio album by Conspirare

Studio album by Conspirare
- Released: 2008
- Recorded: October 2007 at the Troy Music Hall, Troy, New York
- Genre: Classical
- Length: 59:26
- Label: Harmonia Mundi
- Producer: Blanton Alspaugh

Conspirare chronology
Requiem (2006)	Tarik O'Regan: Threshold of Night (2008)	A Company of Voices (2009)

Tarik O'Regan: Threshold of Night is the third release by the choral group Conspirare and the second recording of the work of Tarik O'Regan. The chorus is accompanied by the Company of Strings and led by musical director Craig Hella Johnson. The album was recorded in October 2007 at the Troy Music Hall, Troy, New York, the second Conspirare release to be recorded at this venue and was released by Harmonia Mundi Records in 2008. The tracks are based on the works of Edgar Allan Poe, Pablo Neruda, Kathleen Raine and Emily Dickinson. The album debuted at number ten on the Billboard Top Classical Album chart and was nominated for two Grammy Awards.

== Overview ==
Conspirare began their 2007 season performing the works of British choral composer Tarik O'Regan in their hometown of Austin, Texas. The positive response they received led to this album which was recorded in October 2007 at the Troy Music Hall, Troy, New York.

The album's second track, "The Ecstasies Above", is based on the poem "Israfel" by Edgar Allan Poe; in it the chorus is accompanied by a string quartet, The Company of Strings. The title track, "Threshold of Night", is based on the poetry of Kathleen Raine. The track "Care Charminge Sleepe", which was written by O'Regan while he was getting his Master of Philosophy degree at Corpus Christi College, is based on a scene from Valentinian by Elizabethan playwright John Fletcher.

The album caught the attention of film producer Jerry Bruckheimer who has expressed interest in O'Regan working with him on future film projects. It received two Grammy nominations for Best Classical Album and Best Choral Performance.

== Reception ==
Professional ratings
Review scores
Source	Rating
Allmusic	5/5 stars
The Star-Ledger	4/4 stars

Bradley Bambarger of The Star-Ledger ranked Tarik O'Regan: Threshold of Night number one on his top-ten list of favorite classical albums of 2008. He writes that the selections "vibrate with luminous melodies and ravishing, unsuspected textures". Also in The Star-Ledger, Anthony Venutolo writes that the chorus "finds the musical soul of the words in a way a simple reading never could". Stephen Eddins of Allmusic said the album "establishes a direct emotional connection that's hard to resist" and that the "sense of musical architecture is a key part of the success of [the] work" and that the recording is "clean and vibrant, with just enough resonance".

== Track listing ==
All compositions by Tarik O'Regan

1. "Had I Not Seen the Sun" – 1:52
2. "The Ecstasies Above" – 17:25
3. "Threshold of Night" – 6:19
4. "Tal vez tenemos tiempo" – 7:49
5. "Care Charminge Sleepe" – 6:13
6. "Triptych" – 17:35
7. "I Had No Time to Hate" – 2:13

== Personnel ==
- Craig Hella-Johnson – director
- Melissa Givens – soprano
- Carr Hornbuckle – tenor
- Nina Revering – soprano
- Kathlene Ritch – soprano
- Tracy Shirk – tenor
- Jonathan Subia – tenor

=== Production ===
- Blanton Alspaugh – editor, producer
- Tom Caufield – technical assistance
- John Newton – engineer
- Ed Ruscha – cover photo

== Charts ==
Top Classical Albums
Year	Source	Peak
2008	Billboard	10
