= Cock Tavern Theatre =

Pub theatre in London, England

The Cock Tavern Theatre
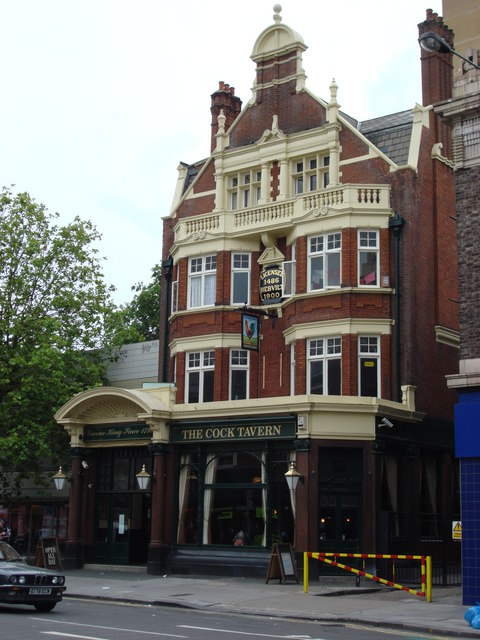
- The Cock Tavern, Kilburn High Road
- Interactive map of The Cock Tavern Theatre
- Address: 125 Kilburn High Road; London, NW6 6JH; England
- Coordinates: 51°32′22″N 0°11′43″W
- Capacity: 56 seats
- Type: Fringe theatre
- Public transit: Kilburn High Road

Construction
- Opened: 4 February 2009
- Closed: 8 April 2011

Website
- http://ctkbargrill.co.uk

The Cock Tavern Theatre was a pub theatre located in Kilburn in the north-west of London. The venue specialised in new works and critical revivals. Resident companies Good Night Out Presents and OperaUpClose were also based at the venue. It shut in 2011, due to health and safety problems regarding the Victorian staircases that serviced the theatre.

== History ==
The Cock Tavern Theatre was founded in January 2009 in the former first floor function room of The Cock Tavern by Adam Spreadbury-Maher, who is currently the theatre's artistic director. Its first production, Shakespeare's The Tempest, premiered on 4 February 2009 directed by Simon Beyer. The theatre was frequently noted for the intimate and authentic experience provided by the backdrop of the upstairs room at the Cock Tavern. Productions were also staged in the bar itself as well as on the first-floor outside terrace.

The Cock Tavern Theatre won the Peter Brook... Empty Space – Dan Crawford Pub Theatre Award in November 2009, just 10 months after opening, where it was praised by theatre critic Mark Shenton:

"The Cock Tavern, with its tiny auditorium of around 40 seats squeezed into three rows, is a quintessentially cramped upstairs pub theatre. But it is also, thanks to the boldness of its producing team, a newly-essential one, both for restoring some past fringe glories and also moving it boldly forward with new work."

Although the Cock Tavern Theatre originally operated as a receiving house alongside its own productions, it developed into a full-fledged production house. Following a health and safety review of the theatre's access and escape stairs, the theatre closed permanently on 8 April 2011. Productions transferred to other theatres.

== Artistic policy and resident companies ==
The Cock Tavern Theatre had a commitment to hosting world premieres and revivals from playwrights whose work is considered by the artistic director to be relatively unrepresented within British Theatre. From 2008, the theatre developed a reputation for imaginative programming and quality productions, and was said to be presenting premieres by playwrights Edward Bond, Charlotte Eilenberg, Jack Hibberd and Nick Ward. All programming at the theatre was provided by its two resident companies.

=== Good Night Out Presents ===
Good Night Out Presents was formed in August 2008 and moved to The Cock Tavern Theatre following a residency at The White Bear Theatre. The company developed a relationship with Nick Ward as the theatre's playwright in residence. His play, The Present, was revived at The Cock Tavern Theatre under the guidance of the playwright in 2009.

=== OperaUpClose ===
OperaUpClose, a company aiming to make opera more accessible and to provide young singers with the chance to make their professional debuts, had its debut production, Puccini's La bohème, at The Cock Tavern Theatre. The production ran from 8 December 2009 to 15 May 2010 and had set Act II in the pub area of The Cock Tavern below the theatre, as an alternative to the Café Momus scene in traditional productions.

== Theatre staff ==
- Adam Spreadbury-Maher – Artistic Director. Spreadbury-Maher is a trained opera singer. An Australian by birth, he came to London in 2005 and made his directing debut at The White Bear Theatre producing three shows as the theatre's Associate Director. In 2008 he founded Good Night Out Presents and in January 2009 secured the premises that make up The Cock Tavern Theatre. In January 2010 he was awarded the Fringe Report award for 'Best Artistic Director', and in March 2010 he was appointed artistic director of The King's Head Theatre in addition to his role at The Cock Tavern Theatre.
- Ben Cooper – Group Commercial Director. Cooper received his degree in Humanities from Bristol University in 2008, and has had experience in both UK and international touring companies.

== Productions ==
Past productions:

=== Season 2010 ===
- A Stretch Of The Imagination by Jack Hibberd, directed by and starring Mark Little, 16 June-17 July 2010,
- Shrunk by Charlotte Eilenberg, directed by Julian Birkett, May 18–12 June 2010
- La Bohème by Giacomo Puccini, translated and directed by Robin Norton-Hale, 10 December 2009 – 15 May 2010
- A Model For Mankind by James Sheldon, directed by Blanche McIntyre, 27 March - 17 April 2010
- Much by Hannah Patterson, directed by Hannah Eidinow, 23 February - 20 March 2010
- Nightsongs by Jon Fosse, directed by Hamish MacDougall, 30 January - 20 February 2010

=== Season 2009 ===
- Secrets, a devised piece directed by Danielle Coleman, 17 November – 5 December 2009
- Three Minute Hero by Phil Setren, 28 October – 14 November 2009
- Together We're Heavy by Chris Purnell, 29 September – 24 October 2009
- Brooklyn by Rose Martula, directed by Russ Hope, 8–25 September 2009
- The Present by Nick Ward, directed by Adam Spreadbury-Maher, 20 August – 5 September 2009
- Product Medea 4.0 by Saša Rakef, directed by Maja Milatović-Ovadia, 2–20 June 2009
- Make Mine A Double: Latin! Or Tobacco And Boys by Stephen Fry and Last Drink by Duncan Ley, directed by Nathan Godkin
- Invisible Storms, a devised piece directed by Jamie Harper, 5–30 May 2009
- The Backroom by Adrian Pagan, starring David Paisley 12 March – 11 April 2009.
- The Tempest by William Shakespeare, directed by Simon Beyer, 4 February – 7 March 2009
