= Peter Gill (playwright) =

Welsh theatre director, playwright and actor (1939–2026)

Peter Gill OBE FRSL
- Born: 7 September 1939; Cardiff, Wales
- Died: 3 August 2026 (aged 86)
- Education: St Illtyd's College, Cardiff
- Occupations: Playwright, theatre director, actor

Peter Gill (7 September 1939 – 3 August 2026) was a Welsh theatre director, playwright and actor.

== Early life ==
Gill was born in Cardiff on 7 September 1939, to George John and Margaret Mary (née Browne) Gill. He was educated at St Illtyd's College, Cardiff.

== Career ==
An actor from 1957–1965, Gill directed his first production without décor, at the Royal Court Theatre in August 1965, A Collier's Friday Night by D. H. Lawrence. Having begun his career as an actor, he is now best known for his work as a director and playwright.

Gill was elected a Fellow of the Royal Society of Literature in 2019.

=== Royal Court ===
In 1964, Gill became Assistant Director at the Royal Court and Associate Director in 1970, best known there as the director of three hitherto under-rated plays by D. H. Lawrence, presented as a group in 1968. In 1969, the Royal Court also presented two of his own first plays, The Sleepers' Den and Over Gardens Out, "which revealed that Gill could evoke with the economy of means and lyrical skill the circumstances of his Cardiff boyhood".

=== Riverside Studios ===
Gill was appointed artistic director of the Riverside Studios in 1976, and on 30 May 1976, his Nottingham/Edinburgh production of As You Like It (starring Jane Lapotaire as Rosalind, John Price as Orlando and Zoë Wanamaker as Celia, with a stage design by William Dudley) marked the official opening of the Hammersmith arts centre, formerly television studios. His first Riverside production was a staging of his own version of Chekhov's The Cherry Orchard, which opened to press acclaim on 12 January 1978 (starring Judy Parfitt as Ranevskaya and Julie Covington as Varya, again with a setting designed by William Dudley).

Writing for The Sunday Times, theatre critic Bernard Levin said:

It is good to salute the opening of a new theatre; it is thrice good to be able to do so with almost unqualified praise for its first production. At the Riverside Studios, Peter Gill (who is in charge of the whole enterprise) has directed The Cherry Orchard with a cast so astonishingly suitable that I began, hallucinatorily, to believe that they had been assembled first, and that Chekhov had then written the play round them. What is more, they are achieving this effect on an impossible stage; it is seventy-five feet wide (the players have to sprint, never mind run, if they are to get off at all), absurdly shallow, and lacking even the most rudimentary trappings in the way of flies, a thrust or even wings.... Mr. Gill and his cast have sought success in the only place it can be found: inside themselves and the play. The effect is magical; The Cherry Orchard has almost never, in my experience, been at once so harrowing and so glittering; nor its fragile rhythms so finely, surely spun, its development so natural, human and real.

When Gill left Riverside in 1980 to be an Associate Director at the National Theatre, a West London theatre critic John Thaxter wrote:

It is no exaggeration to say that Gill's four years as director have taken Riverside to a leading position in British theatre; both with his own productions (notably The Cherry Orchard and this year's Julius Caesar) and as a generous host to world theatre giants: Tadeusz Kantor and Athol Fugard among them....It would also be fair to say that the major portion of the subsidies making all this possible came from the Hammersmith Council, which this year alone provided £200,000 to Riverside, although its audience is drawn from far and wide.

=== National Theatre ===
As an Associate Director of the National Theatre from 1980 to 1997, Gill also founded the National Theatre Studio in 1984, which he ran until 1 October 1990. In his own words:

When I set up the National Theatre Studio the development and analysis of acting was a central part of the work, so that, along with commissioning writers, developing directors and designers, investigating non-text based work, and producing work for the main house, the practice and analysis of acting skills seemed an essential part of any programme of work that was in part concerned with process.

Gill's method of directing is described by Luke Evans in his memoir of 2024. Evans appeared in a revival of Gill's play set in South Wales Small Change.

== Personal life and death ==
Gill lived from the 1960s until 2006 in a small flat in the Thameside house formerly belonging to George Devine and later bought by playwright Donald Howarth and his civil partner George Goetschuis.

Gill was appointed an Officer of the Order of the British Empire (OBE) in the 1980 Birthday Honours.

In 2007, the British Library acquired Peter Gill's papers and supplementary papers consisting of literary works, theatre administration and correspondence. National Life Stories conducted an oral history interview (C1316/08) with Peter Gill in 2008–2009 for its The Legacy of the English Stage Company collection held by the British Library.

Gill died on 3 August 2026, aged 86.

== Filmography ==
Year	Title	Role	Notes
1962	H.M.S. Defiant	Lieut. D'Arblay	
1964	Zulu	Private 612 Williams	

== Plays ==
Plays include:

- The Sleepers Den, 1965; Royal Court, November 1969
- Over Gardens Out, Royal Court, November 1969
- Small Change, Royal Court, February 1976
- Kick for Touch, National Theatre, February 1983
- In the Blue. National Theatre, November 1985
- Mean Tears, National Theatre, July 1987
- Cardiff East, National Theatre, February 1997
- The Look Across the Eyes, published 1997
- Certain Young Men, Almeida Theatre, January 1999
- Friendly Fire, Crucible Youth Theatre, Sheffield, June 2002
- Lovely Evening, Theatre 503, March 2005
- The York Realist, Royal Court, 2002; revived at the Donmar Warehouse and Sheffield Crucible, 2018
- Original Sin, Crucible Sheffield, 2002
- Another Door Closed, Theatre Royal, Bath, 2009
- Versailles, Donmar Warehouse, 2014
- As Good A Time As Any, Print Room, 2015
- Something in the Air, Jermyn Street Theatre, 2022

Adaptations and versions:

- A Provincial Life (Chekhov), Royal Court, 1966
- The Merry-Go-Round (D. H. Lawrence), Royal Court, 1973
- The Cherry Orchard (Chekhov), Riverside Studios, 1978
- Touch and Go (D. H. Lawrence), Riverside Studios, 1980
- As I Lay Dying (William Faulkner), National Theatre, 1985
- The Seagull (Chekhov), Swan Theater, 2000. Commissioned by the Royal Shakespeare Company.
- Uncle Vanya (Chekhov), Theatr Clwyd, Mold & Crucible Studio, Sheffield, 2017

== As director ==
=== Royal Court Theatre ===
- A Collier's Friday Night (D. H. Lawrence), August 1965
- The Local Stigmatic (Heathcote Williams), March 1966
- The Ruffian on the Stair (Joe Orton), August 1966
- A Provincial Life (Chekhov ad. Gill), October 1966
- The Soldier's Fortune (Thomas Otway), January 1967
- The Daughter-in-Law (D. H. Lawrence), March 1967. First prize at the Belgrade International Theatre Festival, 1968
- The Widowing of Mrs Holroyd (D. H. Lawrence), March 1968
- Life Price (Jeremy Seabrook and Michael O'Neill), January 1969
- The Sleepers' Den (Gill), November 1969
- Over Gardens Out (Gill), November 1969
- The Duchess of Malfi (John Webster), May 1972
- Crete and Sergeant Pepper (John Antrobus), May 1972
- The Merry-Go-Round (D. H. Lawrence ad. Gill), November 1973
- The Fool (Edward Bond), November 1975
- Small Change (Gill), July 1976
- The York Realist (Gill), English Touring Theatre, January 2002

=== Riverside Studios ===
- As You Like It, Nottingham and Edinburgh production: opening production at Riverside Studios, 30 May 1976
- The Cherry Orchard (Chekhov, ad. Gill), January 1978
- The Changeling (Thomas Middleton and William Rowley), September 1978
- Measure for Measure (Shakespeare), May 1979
- Julius Caesar (Shakespeare), May 1980
- Scrape Off the Black (Tunde Ikoli), July 1980
- Touch and Go (D. H. Lawrence), rehearsed reading October 1980, to mark the 50th anniversary of the author's death

=== National Theatre ===
- A Month in the Country (Turgenev), Olivier, February 1981
- Don Juan by Molière, Cottesloe, April 1981
- Much Ado About Nothing, Olivier, August 1981
- Danton's Death (Georg Büchner), Olivier, July 1982
- Major Barbara (G B Shaw), Lyttelton, October 1982
- Kick for Touch (Gill), Cottesloe, February 1983
- Small Change (Gill), Cottesloe, February 1983
- Tales from Hollywood (Christopher Hampton), Olivier, September 1983
- Antigone by Sophocles, Cottesloe, October 1983
- Venice Preserv'd by Thomas Otway, Lyttelton, April 1984
- Fool for Love by Sam Shepard, Cottesloe, October 1984
- As I Lay Dying by William Faulkner, adapted by Peter Gill, Cottesloe, October 1985
- Five Play Bill, Cottesloe, November 1985, including In the Blue (Gill)
- Mean Tears (Gill), Cottesloe, July 1987
- Mrs Klein by Nicholas Wright, Cottesloe, August 1988
- Juno and the Paycock by Seán O'Casey, Lyttelton, February 1989
- Cardiff East (Gill), February 1997
- Luther (John Osborne), Olivier, October 2001
- Scenes from the Big Picture (Owen McCafferty), Cottesloe, April 2003
- The Voysey Inheritance by Harley Granville-Barker, Lyttelton, April 2006

=== Other venues ===
- O'Flaherty V.C. by Bernard Shaw, Mermaid Theatre, September 1966
- Crimes of Passion and June Evening (tour), 1967
- Life Price and Much Ado About Nothing, Stratford, Connecticut, 1969
- Landscape and Silence by Harold Pinter, Lincoln Center's Forum Theater, 1970
- Hedda Gabler by Ibsen, Stratford, Ontario, Canada 1970
- Cato Street, Young Vic,1971
- Crete and Sergeant Pepper and Midsummer Night's Dream, Zurich, 1972
- The Daughter-in-Law, Bochum, 1972
- Twelfth Night, RSC Stratford. August 1974, Aldwych Theatre, February 1975
- As You Like It, Nottingham Playhouse, Edinburgh Festival 1975; and the opening of Riverside Studios, 30 May 1976
- The Way of the World by William Congreve, Lyric Hammersmith, October 1992
- New England (Richard Nelson), RSC The Pit, November 1994
- Uncle Vanya (Chekhov) for Field Day, Tricycle Theatre, April 1995
- A Patriot for Me (John Osborne), RSC Barbican Theatre, October 1995
- Tongue of a Bird (Ellen McLaughlin), Almeida Theatre, November 1997
- Certain Young Men (Gill), Almeida Theatre. January 1999
- The Seagull by Chekhov, adapted by Gill, RSC Swan Theatre, Stratford, February 2000; Barbican Theatre, April 2000
- Speed-the-Plow by David Mamet, New Ambassadors Theatre, March 2000; Duke of York's Theatre, June 2000
- The York Realist (Gill) for English Touring Theatre at the Royal Court, January 2002 ; Strand Theatre, March 2002
- Original Sin (Gill), Crucible Theatre, Sheffield, June 2002
- Days of Wine and Roses by J P Miller adapted by Owen McCafferty, Donmar Warehouse, February 2005
- Epitaph for George Dillon by John Osborne and Anthony Creighton, Comedy Theatre, September 2005
- Gaslight by Patrick Hamilton, Old Vic, June 2007
- The Importance of Being Earnest by Oscar Wilde, Theatre Royal Bath and UK Tour 2007; followed by Vaudeville Theatre, 2008
- Another Door Closed by Peter Gill, Theatre Royal, Bath, 2009

== Sources ==
- To Bodies Gone: The Theatre of Peter Gill, by Barney Norris, Seren Books (2014); ISBN 978-1781721810
- Who's Who in the Theatre, 17th Edition, Gale (1981); ISBN 0-8103-0234-9
- Actors Speaking with an introduction by Peter Gill, edited by Lyn Haill, Oberon Books (2007); ISBN 1-84002-776-2
