= Robert Chevara =

British director and writer

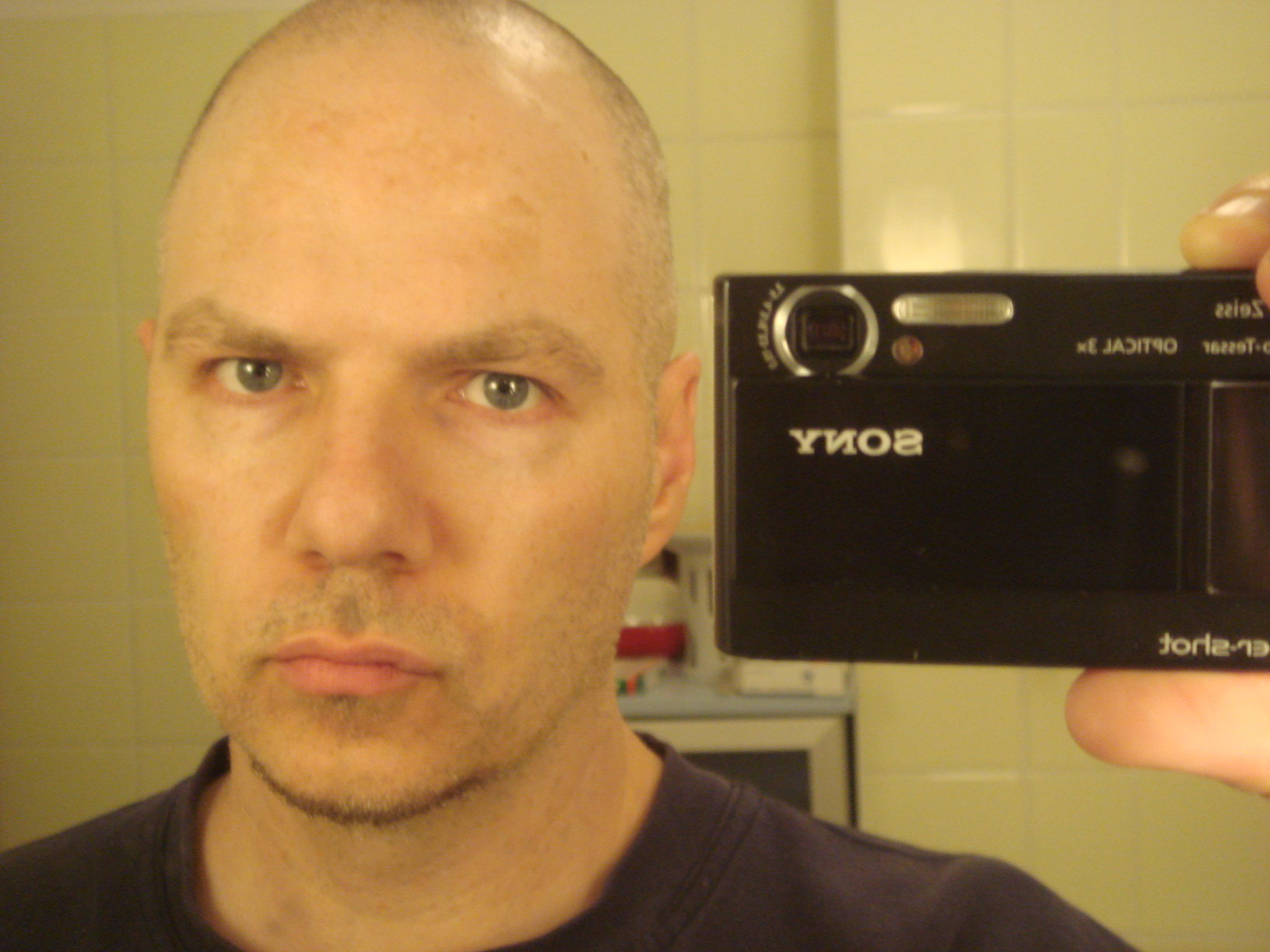
Chevara in 2009

Robert Chevara is a British director and writer. He was born in London to a single parent Mother.

== Early career ==
An original member of The Old Vic Youth Theatre with Sophie Thompson, Oliver Parker, Linda Henry, April De Angelis and Rikki Beadle-Blair. He met Rikki there when he was fifteen years old and they became lifelong friends. He started an a cappella singing group with Michelle Baughan and Rikki called Three People when he was seventeen. The group sang at the opening of Gay's the Word bookshop. He headlined singing before 40,000 people at Gay Pride on a bill which included Sandie Shaw and Andy Bell.

He wrote several articles about Teenagers' problems for Gay Times, book and Ballet reviews for various magazines and assisted Derek Jarman on his film of The Tempest.

At nineteen years old he started his first theatre company (Rollercoaster) and directed "Mary Rose" by J.M. Barrie, "Hamlet" and his own play "Larks" to huge critical and commercial success. Rikki Beadle-Blair was Hamlet in the groundbreaking production.

He then assisted Richard Jones on a production of "Rigoletto" for Opera 80 and also assisted David Freeman on several productions. David became his mentor and offered him his London opera debut directing Bruno Maderna's Satyricon for David's company Opera Factory. It was the opera's UK premiere, controversial, highly successful and Chevara received further offers to direct Worldwide.

== Career ==
ROBERT CHEVARA is a freelance theatre and opera director who divides his time between London and Berlin. He is currently an Associate Director at the King's Head Theatre in London, and was previously the Director of Productions at English Touring Opera for four years. He is the recipient of a cultural study award from the Japanese Government, as well as a Churchill Fellowship award. His production of Tennessee Williams's Vieux Carré won Best Revival of a Play Award 2013 from Front Row Dress. His production of William's In the Bar of a Tokyo Hotel starring Linda Marlowe was cited in The Times as one of the great productions of 2016. He's fluent in French, German and Italian.

His numerous theatre productions include the world premiere of Lionel Bart's musical Quasimodo (Kings Head Theatre, 2013); Tennessee Williams's Vieux Carré (Charing Cross Theatre transfer from King's Head Theatre) and The Glass Menagerie (TheatreSpace, London); As You Like It (English Theatre Berlin); Fair!, devised play with music (NYT at Bullwood Hall Prison, Essex); Caryl Churchill's Top Girls (Hau Theatre, Berlin); Cake/Hotter than Rochester by Paul Doust (Paines Plough / Théâtre du Neslé. Paris); Strindberg's Easter (TheatreSpace, London); Mary and Frank by Robert Chevara (Bush Theatre); Eva Perón/The Four Twins, a double-bill by Copi and The Magic Box by Bertie Marshall Battersea Arts Centre; the Danish premiere of Mike Bartlett's Cock and Bull (Aalborg Teater); the German Premiere of Gail Louw's Blonde Poison (Brotfabrik Berlin); plays at Theatre Royal Stratford East, Soho Theatre, Arcola Theatre and Unity 1918 by John Kerr (Old Vic Theatre).

For Opera, his productions include West End Girl (a new version of Puccini's La Fanciulla del West, King's Head Theatre); Albert Herring (Britten, Copenhagen Opera House); La Voix Humaine (Cocteau/Poulenc, Stockholm Opera House, awarded Best Contemporary Opera production in Sweden); Powder Her Face (Thomas Adès, Ystad Opera, awarded Best Contemporary Opera Production in Sweden); Potent Shakespeare (Andrew Toovey, Festival Hall, London); Pascal Dusapin's To Be Sung (world premiere, Banff Centre); Puccini's Madama Butterfly (New Zealand Opera); Stravinsky's The Rake's Progress, Bizet's Carmen, Verdi's Macbeth, Beethoven's Fidelio, Massenet's Werther (all English Touring Opera); Barber's A Hand of Bridge; Gershwin's Blue Monday; and Bernstein's Trouble in Tahiti (all Barbican Centre, designed by Chevara); Mozart's Magic Flute (Holland Park Opera, London); Dvořák's The Cunning Peasant; Poulenc's Les Dialogue des Carmélites; and Britten's Albert Herring (all Guildhall School of Music and Drama; Mozart's Idomeneo, Rossini's La Cenerentola and Britten's A Midsummer Night's Dream (all Copenhagen Opera Academy); Prokofiev's The Fiery Angel (Royal Opera House, Associate Director with David Freeman); Rossini's The Barber of Seville (Dublin Grand Opera); Maderna's Satyricon (Opera Factory/The Drill Hall, London); as well as numerous operas by Rameau, Haydn, Verdi, Bizet, Rossini, Handel, Donizetti (all Royal Academy of Music and Royal College of Music)

He has also directed large casts of adults and young people including the world premiere of Luciano Berio's Twice Upon (180 children and 3 soloists), Royal Festival Hall, the first ever Southbank Centre Summer School and work in prisons for the National Youth Theatre.

== TV ==
THE VAMPIRE (Der Vampyr), a BBC TV mini-series which was a Bafta and Prix Italia winner.

== Films ==
Shot and directed two recent films: "Sandra" and "Who's Afraid of Woof Woof Woof?". "Woof" was screened to great acclaim at the London Lesbian and Gay Film Festival.

== Writer ==
He wrote a book, West End Girl, (Oberon Books), several successful plays and numerous published poems. He's also written several opera libretti. His first poetry collection, 'Perfect. Scar', edited by Rikki Beadle-Blair and John R Gordon was published by Team Angelica Publishing 22 April 2022.

== Awards ==
2016 "In the bar of a Tokyo Hotel" selected as one of the 10 best productions of the year. The Times.
2013 Best Revival of a Play for Vieux Carré from Front Row Dress
2009 Best Contemporary Opera Production Award (La Voix Humaine) Sweden
1999 Best Contemporary Opera Production Award (Powder Her Face) Sweden
1997 Japanese Government Cultural Study Award
1995 Churchill Fellowship Award for Opera

== External links and sources ==
- Time Out
- BBC
- Broadway World
- Personal homepage
- Robert Chevara at IMDb
- Robert Israel
- The Independent
- Brief clip of opera
- Club photographer
- The Guardian review
- Westend Wilma
