= Donald Trefusis =

- First appearance: Loose Ends (radio series)
- Created by: Stephen Fry

In-universe information
- Occupation: Regius Professor of Philology at the University of Cambridge and Extraordinary Fellow of St Matthew's College
- Relatives: Phillip (nephew)

Professor Donald Cornwallis Treadway Trefusis (1921–2008) is an eccentric fictional character created by Stephen Fry.

He initially appeared as an occasional contributor of "wireless essays" to Ned Sherrin's BBC Radio 4 programme Loose Ends in 1986. Trefusis was portrayed as a senior tutor at the fictional St Matthew's College and professor of philology at the University of Cambridge. He is an important character in the novel The Liar. Transcripts of the Loose Ends broadcasts were published as essays in Paperweight.

In addition to a propensity for taking very liberal positions on a range of social issues, as when he states his credentials as "a lover of truth, a worshipper of freedom, a celebrant at the altar of language and purity and tolerance," the greetings and salutations to his broadcasts almost always consist of a non-sequitur (e.g. "Hugely so to you all [...] And if you have been, then it was").

In 2009 Trefusis returned from the grave in a new audio series The Dongle of Donald Trefusis.
