= Stephanie Sinclaire =

American artist (1954–2021)

Stephanie Sinclaire Lightsmith (February 28, 1954 – 14 April 2021), also known as Stephanie Crawford, was a poet, novelist, playwright, painter, teacher of inspirational creativity, and director in theatre and film. She published an anthology of poetry called Burnt Offering in 2002, as well as an auto-biographical novel: The Shores of Grace. In 2020 she published her philosophical magnum opus: Creative Alchemy, detailing the method that she developed for using creative expression as a healing modality.

Stephanie wrote and directed many plays and adaptations for theatre, as well as directing and producing films including:

- Short Film & Academy Award Finalist: The Dance of Shiva (2000)
- Short FilmThe Tell Tale Heart (2004) Available to watch at BFI On Demand:
- Feature Film Silence Becomes You (2005)
- Feature Documentary A Maverick In London: The Story of The King's Head Theatre (2006)

Stephanie was Associate Artistic Director of the King's Head Theatre in Islington from 1990 - 2006 alongside her husband, Artistic Director and Founder: Daniel Frank Crawford. In 2002, Dan and Stephanie were jointly awarded Her Majesty Queen Elizabeth's Golden Jubilee Award for services to theatre. After Dan's Death in 2005, Stephanie became Artistic Director of the King's Head (2006 - 2012), before emigrating to New Zealand in 2012 to be with her daughter, Katherine and grandchildren.

== Early life ==
She was born Stephanie Anne Weiss on February 28, 1954, in New York to Harvard Law graduate and Naval officer Howard A Weiss and singer and painter Bernice Joan Smith. Her parents divorced and when she was three years old and her mother married Joseph DiLalla, a small band leader, who played with ‘Baby’ Rose Marie, Jimmy Durante, Louis Armstrong and others in Las Vegas and elsewhere, travelling continually around America in their Cadillac. She is one of nine siblings.

In 1968 she attended Windsor Mountain High School in Lenox, Massachusetts, a utopian experiment that began in Europe. In 1972 she enrolled in the California College of the Arts in Oakland, California, where she studied literature with absurdist playwright Michael McClure and painting while working for Laurel Burch jewellery design. She could not complete her degree as her father stopped paying the course fees as he disapproved of her living with a boyfriend.

== Personal life ==
Sinclaire Lightsmith married Matthew Eliot Kastin in 1980 and moved to West Stockbridge, Massachusetts. Their only daughter, Katherine Wyeth (nee Kastin), was born soon after, and went on to be an actor, writer, therapist, and theatre & film producer. In 1984 they moved to London to join her husband's former stepfather, Daniel Crawford, who had founded the King's Head Theatre, in Islington in 1970. Dan was eccentric, charismatic, and loved stories of all kinds. Within a year she had fallen in love with him, and divorced Kastin. Sinclaire Lightsmith and Crawford married in 1985.

In the 1990s she changed her name to Sinclaire, as she wanted a name that was not given to her by a man. She later extended this to Sinclaire Lightsmith.

She moved to New Zealand in 2012, and died on 14 April 2021 from a sudden heart arrhythmia while swimming in the sea. She is survived by her eight siblings, her daughter Katherine Wyeth, and her three grandchildren.

== Career ==
A painter and a poet at the time of her marriage to Crawford, she became increasingly involved with the King's Head Theatre, first as Literary Manager and then as Associate Artistic Director. During that time she produced over 60 plays and musicals many of which were award-winning or transferred to London's West End or Broadway. Many famous actors began their careers at the Kings Head Theatre, including Hugh Grant, Imelda Staunton and Victoria Wood. Stars would return out of their love for Sinclaire Lightsmith and Crawford.

She continued to paint, exhibit and curate exhibitions under the banner of Archangel Exhibitions. She has exhibited her paintings internationally and was curator of two international exhibitions in London, American's Abroad at Smith's Gallery Covent Garden, London, examining the work of artists born or raised in America who had deeply influenced European culture such as Cy Twombly, Man Ray, Niki de Saint Phalle and others (catalogue by art historian Keith Wheldon) and The London Influence, an examination of International artists living in London including Susan Hiller, John Kirby, Rachel Whiteread and Jacqueline Moreau, at The Slaughterhouse Gallery, Smithfields, London.

In early 1990s Sinclaire began writing for theatre and latterly directing, including Parallel Vision (writer), Dance with the Devil (writer), The Famous Five (co-writer and co-lyricist) a musical based on The Famous Five which premiered in London, toured the UK and later published on VHS and DVD under the title The Famous Five – Smuggler’s Gold – The Musical (1997).

Dear Brutus (adapter/ director/ producer), began her love affair with J. M. Barrie. The highly lauded production resulted in the Barrie estate awarding her the much coveted film rights. Her subsequent screenplay, called The Shadow Master, is in development for a feature film starring Richard Attenborough. In 2006 she adapted and directed Peter Pan, which was presented at The King's Head in honour of Dan Crawford, and featured the World premiere of the lost Leonard Bernstein score.

Stephanie directed The Shadow Master (top five critics choice, The Times, Benedict Nightingale) late summer 2008 as a unique stage to screen project, directing the screenplay fully underscored on stage at the Kings Head Theatre.

In 2002 she was co-recipient, with Dan Crawford, of Her Majesty the Queen's Golden Jubilee Award for ‘contribution to the arts and pursuit of excellence’ in the field of direction for the Kings Head Theatre and its young director's trainee programme presented by the Queen and Lord Attenborough. The programme mentors young theatre directors in an apprentice setting at the Kings Head theatre and was the largest and most successful of its kind for over a decade introducing as many as 12 trained professionals into various aspects of the industry yearly.

Sinclaire made a move from theatre to film in the late 1990s but returned to maintain Dan Crawford's estate after his death in 2005 and ran the theatre as artistic director until 2012. She also became the licensee and publican of the Kings Head Theatre Pub. The Kings Head was founded by Dan in 1970 and was under the directorship of one family for over 40 years. Kings Head Theatre Patrons include Sir Alan Parker and Sir Tom Stoppard, Joanna Lumley, Maureen Lipman, Don Black and Victoria Wood. It is a well loved and Internationally known theatre that has enjoyed over 40 transfers to the West End in Broadway.

Sinclaire's first film, as co-producer, The Dance of Shiva was an Academy Award Finalist in 2000 and featured Kenneth Branagh, Sam West, Sanjeev Bhaskar and Paul McGann with Director of Photography Jack Cardiff behind the camera. Stephanie adapted, directed and produced The Tell Tale Heart, based on Edgar Allan Poe’s short story, with Jack Cardiff again as cinematographer and Production Designer Peter Murton which opened the Art Institute of Chicago’s 7th European Film Festival. She wrote, directed and produced Silence Becomes You, a feature film with Alicia Silverstone and Sienna Guillory. She wrote, co-directed (with award-winning Director Jason Figgis of October Eleven Pictures) and produced A Maverick in London, a documentary about Kings Head founder, her late husband, Dan Crawford and The Kings Head Theatre, featuring Joanna Lumley, Alan Rickman, Sir Tom Stoppard, Steven Berkoff, Sir Antony Sher and many others.

Sinclaire also co-wrote and produced the short film Goblin Market in 2016, adapted from the narrative poem by Christina Rosetti; as well as producing the short film Tears of Valhalla.

Stephanie Sinclaire Lightsmith was the director of Dragonlady Films and Theatre, formerly called Dragonfly Films and the author of Burnt Offering (poetry) and The Shores of Grace an odyssey, which has been distributed to all the UK prisons through the Prism Project and the US women's prisons through the Edgar Cayce Foundation.

One year before her Death, Stephanie published her philosophical magnum opus: Creative Alchemy: The Science of Miracles, which featured a foreword by Jack Canfield, co-author of the best-selling Chicken Soup for the Soul book series, and won the prodigious Ashton Wylie Mind Body Spirit Book Award in 2020.

== Writing ==
Sinclaire published a poetry collection and two novels, connecting creativity, spirituality and therapeutic healing.

- Burnt Offering (2002)
- The Shores of Grace: An Odyssey (2002)
- Creative Alchemy: The Science of Miracles (2020) Available to purchase from Amazon:

== Selected publications ==
- Lightsmith, Stephanie Sinclaire (2020). Creative alchemy : the science of miracles. [Wellington]. ISBN 978-0473564889.
- Sinclaire, Stephanie (2002). Burnt Offering. Golden Eagle Publishing. ISBN 9781902043067.
- Sinclaire, Stephanie (2002). The shores of grace : an odyssey. London: Octopuss Press. ISBN 9781904222002. Also published as God's Theory of Creativity
