= Edward Dick =

British theatre director

Edward Dick is a British theatre director.

== Biography ==
He graduated from Oxford University in 2001 and trained as Declan Donnellan's assistant at Cheek by Jowl. He has directed productions, most notably of plays by Shakespeare, in theatres around the world. In 2009 he directed a revival of Philip Ridley's The Fastest Clock in the Universe at Hampstead Theatre starring Jaime Winstone. In 2008 he directed Benjamin Britten's opera The Rape of Lucretia at Aldeburgh, and in 2011 he directed a new opera by Tarik O'Regan at the Royal Opera House in London. His short film An Act of Love premiered at the Edinburgh International Film Festival in 2010.

On 2 August 2016, Dick is set to direct an episode of the BBC One medical drama Holby City.
