= Tarik O'Regan =

British and American composer

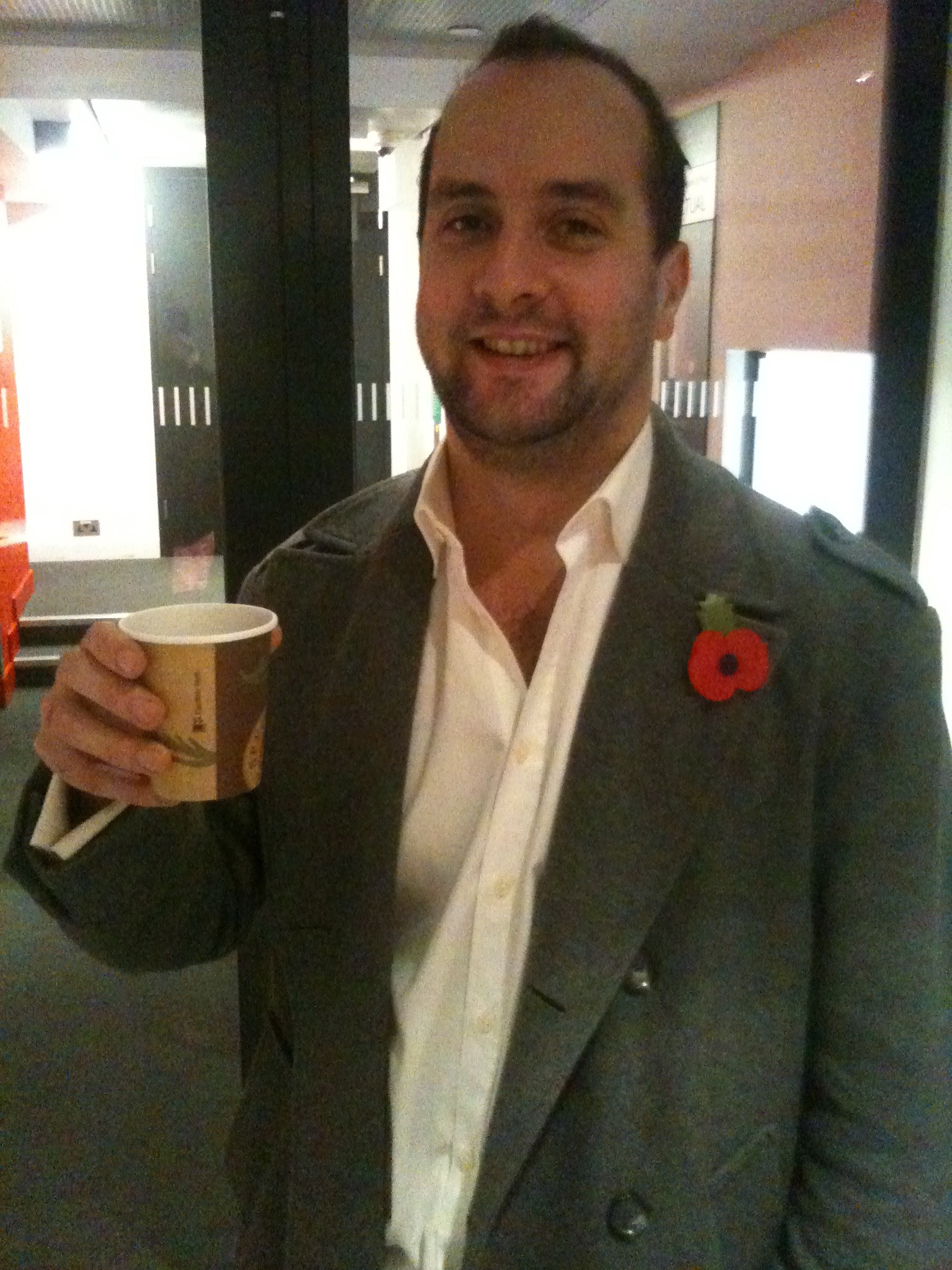
- Born: Tarik Hamilton O'Regan; 1 January 1978 (age 48); London, United Kingdom
- Education: Royal College of Music (Junior Department), Pembroke College, Oxford and Corpus Christi College, Cambridge
- Occupation: Composer
- Notable work: See works list
- Movement: Postminimalism
- Website: tarikoregan.com

Tarik Hamilton O'Regan (/ˈtærɪk oʊˈriːɡən/; born 1 January 1978) is a British and American composer. His compositions are partially represented on numerous recordings which have been recognised with two Grammy nominations. He is also the recipient of two British Composer Awards. O'Regan has served on the Faculties of Columbia University as a Fulbright Chester Schirmer Fellow, The Radcliffe Institute of Harvard University as a Radcliffe Fellow, Yale University, Trinity College in the University of Cambridge, Rutgers University, Stanford University as a Visiting Artist, and the Institute for Advanced Study in Princeton as Director's Visitor.

O'Regan's compositions incorporate the influence of Renaissance vocal writing, the music of North Africa, British rock bands of the 1960s and 1970s, jazz and Minimalist music. His music is often rhythmically complex and employs varying approaches to tonality.

== Life and work ==
=== 1978–2001: Beginnings, early education, and influences ===
Tarik O'Regan was born in London in 1978. He grew up predominantly in Croydon in South London, to an English father of Irish descent and an Algerian mother, spending some of his early childhood in Algeria and Morocco, the latter where his mother was born. He was educated at Whitgift School then Pembroke College, Oxford, where he studied music and, in 1997, he received his first commissions from the Choir of New College, Oxford (conducted by Edward Higginbottom) and James Bowman. During this time, he studied composition privately with Jeremy Dale Roberts.

Following completion of his undergraduate studies in 1999, he began serving as the classical recordings reviewer for The Observer newspaper, a position he held until 2003. At the same time he also worked for JPMorgan Chase, the investment bank. He completed his postgraduate studies under the direction of Robin Holloway at Cambridge, where he was appointed Composer in Residence at Corpus Christi College in 2000 and formally began his career as a composer, with his first published works appearing in 2001 on the Finnish Sulasol imprint.

=== 2002–2011: Early compositional career ===
2002 marked two important London premieres: those of Clichés with the London Sinfonietta and The Pure Good of Theory with the BBC Symphony Orchestra. In 2004, O'Regan moved to New York City to take up the Chester Schirmer Fulbright Fellowship at Columbia University and subsequently a Radcliffe Institute Fellowship at Harvard. During this period, his composition Sainte won the Vocal category of the 2005 British Composer Awards and his debut disc, VOICES was released on the Collegium label.

Beginning in 2007, O'Regan began dividing his time between the UK and the US when he was appointed Fellow Commoner in the Creative Arts at Trinity College, Cambridge, a position he held until 2009. During his tenure at Cambridge, his composition Threshold of Night won the Liturgical category of the 2007 British Composer Awards and Scattered Rhymes, his first CD on the Harmonia Mundi label, performed by the Orlando Consort and the Estonian Philharmonic Chamber Choir conducted by Paul Hillier, was released in 2008.

O'Regan's second disc on the Harmonia Mundi label, Threshold of Night, appeared in late 2008 and awakened a wider interest in his work, demonstrated by the CD garnering two GRAMMY Award nominations in 2009: Best Classical Album and Best Choral Performance. After this, he increased his output as a music commentator in print and on air, especially on BBC Radio 3 and BBC Radio 4. This aspect of his career broadened with the broadcasting in 2010 on BBC Radio 4 of Composing New York, a documentary written and presented by O'Regan. In the same year, he was appointed to the Institute for Advanced Study in Princeton as a Director's Visitor and made his BBC Proms debut with Latent Manifest performed by the Royal Philharmonic Orchestra. O'Regan's third album on the Harmonia Mundi label, Acallam na Senórach: an Irish Colloquy (based on the 12th century Middle Irish narrative of the same name) was released in October 2011.

=== 2011–2022: Major stage works - Heart of Darkness, Mata Hari, and The Phoenix ===
In 2011, Heart of Darkness, O'Regan's chamber opera in one act, with an English-language libretto by artist Tom Phillips, based on the novella of the same name by Joseph Conrad was premiered at the Linbury Theatre of the Royal Opera House. The idea for the opera first came to O'Regan in 2001. It received wide critical attention and marked his first foray into operatic writing. A suite for orchestra and narrator was extrapolated from the opera and was given its London premiere by the Royal Philharmonic Orchestra and actor Samuel West in April 2013. In May 2015, Heart of Darkness received its North American premiere in a production by Opera Parallèle, presented by Z Space in San Francisco, California.

O'Regan's first full-length ballet score (Mata Hari, based on the life of Margaretha Zelle MacLeod), commissioned by the Dutch National Ballet with choreography by Ted Brandsen, opened on 6 February 2016 in Amsterdam. On 30 September 2016 Mata Hari was released in DVD and Blu-ray formats by EuroArts, distributed by Warner Classics; the ballet will be revived for a further run in October, 2017.

In February 2017, O'Regan's first album of orchestral music, A Celestial Map of the Sky, performed by The Hallé under the direction of Sir Mark Elder and Jamie Phillips, was released on the NMC label. The album entered the British Official Charts at number seven in the Specialist Classical Chart and number 18 in the Classical Artist Albums Chart. In the same year he was elected both to an Honorary Fellowship of Pembroke College, Oxford, and to the board of Yaddo.

In 2019, O'Regan's opera The Phoenix with a libretto by John Caird was premiered at the Houston Grand Opera. The story was derived from the life of Mozart’s librettist, Lorenzo Da Ponte. Patrick Summers conducted the opera with Thomas Hampson and Luca Pisaroni playing Da Ponte at different stages of his life. The designs were by David Farley with lighting by Michael Clarke and choreography by Tim Claydon. He was subsequently appointed Philharmonia Baroque Orchestra's first-ever Composer-in-Residence from the 2021/2022 season onward.

From 2011 to 2022, O'Regan composed several pieces influenced by his North African heritage, which included his first collaborations with both the Dutch National Ballet and the Australian Chamber Orchestra, which would eventually culminate in a triptych of orchestral works: Raï (2011), Chaâbi (2012) and Trances (2022). His output also began to form the focus of festivals such as the 2014 Vale of Glamorgan Festival and New Music for New Age from The Washington Chorus.

=== 2023-present: The Coronation of Charles III and the Yaddo Artist Medal ===
In 2023, O'Regan was one of five composers asked to write a new piece for the coronation service of Charles III and Camilla in Westminster Abbey. The king commissioned O’Regan having heard his music at Lincoln Cathedral in 2006. His setting of the Agnus Dei, Coronation Agnus Dei, was performed during the Eucharist. O'Regan said of the piece, "I wanted to explore influences from my own varied heritages within the context of the Agnus Dei in the British choral tradition: a unison melody is slowly fragmented to create myriad timbres, much as one might hear in some Arab or Irish traditional music. This melodic shifting is also reminiscent of 'phase music', strongly connected with San Francisco, where I wrote this work. Finally, there is an alternating verse anthem structure: a nod to Orlando Gibbons, who became Organist of Westminster Abbey exactly 400 years ago."

In June, 2024 O'Regan was announced as a recipient of the Yaddo Artist Medal, which "recognizes individuals who exemplify a level of achievement and commitment to their art that reflects the tradition of excellence that has always been a hallmark of the Yaddo residency program, as well as celebrating those who have been supportive and understand the sense of community that it has long promoted among artists."

== Music ==
=== Style ===
O'Regan's music is mostly written in tonal, extended-tonal and modal languages (or a combination of all three), often with complicated rhythmic effects and dense textural variation.

=== Influences ===
In various radio and print interviews, O'Regan has stated that he "came to music quite late", mentioning the age of 13 as when he first was able to read music, and has listed five primary influences on his work:

1. Renaissance vocal writing: from some of the repertoire performed by the college choirs at the Universities of Oxford and Cambridge where he was educated, although O'Regan describes himself as being "a pretty bad singer".
2. The music of North Africa: from his own maternal heritage and time spent in Algeria and Morocco during his youth.
3. British rock bands of the 1960s and 1970s: such as The Who and Led Zeppelin, first encountered in his mother's LP collection.
4. Jazz: predominantly artists recorded on the Blue Note label in the 1950s and 1960s jazz, an interest first explored in his father's LP collection.
5. Minimalist music

An article in The Irish Times on 23 November 2010 suggested that O'Regan is also interested in his Irish heritage. Published on the occasion of the first performance of Acallam na Senórach (a setting of The Middle Irish narrative of the same name), the article stated that Sir William Rowan Hamilton is a direct ancestor of O'Regan (his great-great-great-grandfather), whose middle name is Hamilton.

== Critical reception ==
- His 2006 debut disc, VOICES (Collegium Records COL CD 130), recorded by the Choir of Clare College, Cambridge, heralded O'Regan as "one of the most original and eloquent of young British composers" (The Observer, London), "breathing new life into the idiom" (The Daily Telegraph, London). International Record Review declared the recording "a committed, persuasive and highly accomplished performance of an exceptional composing voice of our time", while BBC Music Magazine gave the disc a double five-star rating.
- Scattered Rhymes (2008), O'Regan's first disc from Harmonia Mundi, was described as "a stunning recording" (BBC Radio 3 CD Review), "exquisite and delicate" (The Washington Post), "a fascinating disc" (The Daily Telegraph, London) and "typically unfaultable" (BBC Music Magazine). After the June 2006 premiere of the eponymous work at the Spitalfields Festival, Geoff Brown, in The Times (London), described "O'Regan's gift for lyric flight [as] boundless. You might have to reach back to Vaughan Williams's Serenade to Music, or even Tallis, to find another British vocal work so exultant."
- The 2008 release of Threshold of Night marked O'Regan's international breakthrough. The disc debuted at No. 10 on the Billboard chart and garnered two GRAMMY nominations in 2009 before going on to receive wide critical attention.
- The 2010 BBC Proms premiere of Latent Manifest performed by the Royal Philharmonic Orchestra, conducted by Andrew Litton, was widely reviewed in London: "[a] personal canvas, taking us a long way from a literal reworking into the realms of evanescent fantasy, with delicately evocative results" (The Guardian, London), "a beguiling response to response itself – a mirage of intimations and allusions to [O'Regan's] own experience of hearing Bach's third solo Violin Sonata" (The Times, London), "a gracefully-controlled meditation on a single Bach phrase" (The Independent, London).
- The premiere production of O'Regan's first opera, Heart of Darkness (2011), opened to numerous reviews, both in print an online. Anna Picard described the opera as an "audacious, handsome debut" in The Independent on Sunday and Stephen Pritchard, in The Observer, explained that "the brilliance of [the] opera lies in its ability to convey all that horror without the compulsion to show it – the ultimate psychodrama – and to employ music of startling beauty to tell such a brutal tale". Pritchard also described the music as "a score of concise originality". For a full account of the critical response to the opera, see Heart of Darkness (opera).
- The 2017 release of A Celestial Map of the Sky, O'Regan's first orchestral album, was also widely reviewed: "Luminous beauty ... glows with jewel-like warmth" (The Observer); "This is a good sampling that shows the range of O'Regan's work ... these would seem pieces that are soon to enter a great many orchestral and choral repertories. Highly recommended." (AllMusic); "A splendid and highly recommended programme of music." (Composition Today)
- O'Regan was included in The Washington Post's annual list of "composers, performers and artists hitting their stride with work that resonates with the right now" for 2022.
- The 2023 premiere of O'Regan's Coronation Agnus Dei for the Coronation of Charles III and Camilla in Westminster Abbey was mentioned in several accounts of the event: "An ethereal and exquisitely worked setting, worthy to stand alongside O taste and see, the communion anthem composed by Vaughan Williams for the 1953 Coronation." (Gramophone); "But of the new compositions, only the unfurling melodic lines and understated beauty of Tarik O’Regan’s Agnus Dei exceeded the blandly forgettable." (The Guardian); "The last of the new pieces, Tarik O'Regan’s setting of the Greek prayer the Agnus Dei, was the most successful. It had the reflective note tinged with the diverse musical influences that the King was hoping for, but it was rooted in something simple anyone could register immediately – a melodic phrase with a modal tinge that could have been Arab or eastern European." (The Telegraph); "I loved Tarik O’Regan’s Agnus Dei – bringing a welcome degree of aural mysticism into the service." (The Times, London)

== Publications and works list ==
Tarik O'Regan's earliest works were published by Oxford University Press and Sulasol; since 2004 his music has been exclusively published by Novello & Company, part of the Wise Music Group.

=== Stage ===
- (2026) Testament (opera)
- (2021) Mata Hari (ballet, reduced orchestra version)
- (2018) The Phoenix (opera)
- (2016) Mata Hari (ballet)
- (2013) The Wanton Sublime (monodrama)
- (2011) Heart of Darkness (opera)

=== Orchestra ===
- (2024) Interim
- (2023) Spotlight (theme from Oratorio of Hope)
- (2022) Recalcitrance (excerpted from Trances)
- (2022) Trances
- (2012) Chaâbi
- (2012) Fragments from a Heart of Darkness (full orchestra version)
- (2012) Suite from Heart of Darkness for narrator and full orchestra
- (2011) Raï (orchestra version)
- (2010) Latent Manifest
- (2008) Maybe we have time
- (2004) Hudson Lullaby

=== Orchestra with soloist ===
- (2026) Course for oud, strings, and percussion
- (2022) Machine for saxophone and string orchestra
- (2014) Corsair for oud and orchestra
- (2000) The Pure Good of Theory for violin and orchestra

=== Orchestra with chorus ===
- (2025) Critical Mass
- (2024) The Wonders We Seek Without Us
- (2023) Coronation Agnus Dei (choir and string orchestra version)
- (2022) The Quickening
- (2022) No one can hear themselves staying
- (2015) A Letter of Rights
- (2014) A Celestial Map of the Sky
- (2012) After Rain (Petrichor)
- (2011) Solitude Trilogy
- (2011) The Ecstasies Above (orchestra version, arranged by Daniel Moreira)
- (2008) Care Charminge Sleepe (orchestra version)
- (2008) Martyr
- (2007) Stolen Voices
- (2005) And There Was a Great Calm
- (2005) Triptych
- (2004) Threnody

=== Chamber ensemble ===
- (2022) The Golden Measure (from Ancestor, with Errollyn Wallen)
- (2016) Gradual (revised 2021)
- (2013) Virelai: Douce Dame Jolie (recorder quartet version)
- (2012) Fragments from a Heart of Darkness (chamber ensemble version)
- (2012) Suite from Heart of Darkness for narrator and chamber ensemble
- (2011) A Ducal Fanfare
- (2010) A Drifting Life
- (2008) Darkness Visible
- (2008) The Woven Child
- (2006) Raï
- (2005) Fragment for String Quartet
- (2005) Fragments from a Gradual Process

=== Chamber ensemble with chorus ===
- (2016) Mass Observation
- (2013) Blessed are they
- (2010) The Night's Untruth
- (2009) The Eyes of the Stars
- (2008) Threshold of Light
- (2007) The Taxi
- (2006) The Ecstasies Above

=== Chorus ===
- (2024) Dominion of Light
- (2024) Per pale azure from The Wonders We Seek Without Us
- (2023) Coronation Agnus Dei
- (2020) The Stillness Chained
- (2019) Facing West
- (2018) Keep
- (2017) All things common
- (2017) As One
- (2016) Turn
- (2016) 'I Listen to the Stillness of You' from Mass Observation
- (2015) Itself is all the like it has
- (2014) Tell me
- (2014) Love Reckons By Itself Alone
- (2012) All Creation Slept
- (2012) Ecce Puer
- (2012) Night City
- (2011) Beloved, all things ceased
- (2011) fleeting, God
- (2010) Acallam na Senórach
- (2010) Death is gonna lay his cold icy hands on me
- (2010) Swing Low, sweet chariot
- (2009) Jubilate Deo (Latin setting)
- (2009) Martyr Dei (Martyr of God) from Sequence for St Wulfstan
- (2009) No Matter
- (2009) The Great Silence
- (2009) That music always round me
- (2008) Nunc Dimittis (for double chorus)
- (2008) Se lamentar augelli
- (2008) The Spring from Acallam na Senórach
- (2008) The St Andrews Responsories
- (2008) Voce mea
- (2007) A Light Exists in Spring
- (2007) Ipsa vivere
- (2007) Jubilate Deo (English Version)
- (2007) Puer natus est
- (2007) Tal vez tenemos tiempo
- (2007) Two Emily Dickinson Settings
- (2007) Virelai: Douce dame jolie
- (2006) Hymnus de Sancte Andree Apostole (Hymn of Saint Andrew the Apostle) from Sequence for St Wulfstan
- (2006) I sleep, but my heart waketh
- (2006) Israfel
- (2006) Scattered Rhymes
- (2006) Threshold of Night
- (2006) The Windows
- (2005) Haec deum celi (Thou the true Virgin Mother of the Highest) from Sequence for St Wulfstan
- (2005) Lamentation
- (2005) We Remember Them
- (2004) Alleluia, laus et gloria
- (2004) Bring rest, sweet dreaming child
- (2004) Dorchester Canticles
- (2004) Gloria
- (2003) Beatus auctor sæculi (Blest author of this earthly frame) from Sequence for St Wulfstan
- (2003) O vera digna hostia (O Thou from whom hell's monarch flies) from Sequence for St Wulfstan
- (2003) Tu claustra stirpe regia (O Thou, from regal ancestry) from Sequence for St Wulfstan
- (2003) Tu, trinitatis unitas (You oneness of the Trinity) from Sequence for St Wulfstan
- (2002) Cantate Domino
- (2002) Surrexit Christus
- (2001) Agnus Dei
- (2001) Corpus Christi Service
- (2001) I Saw Him Standing
- (2001) Magnificat and Nunc Dimittis
- (2000) Care Charminge Sleepe
- (2000) Gratias tibi
- (1999) Ave Maria
- (1999) Columba aspexit
- (1999) Locus iste

=== Solo instrumental ===
- (2016) Chorale Prelude on 'Wenn dich Unglück tut greifen an'
- (2014) Alice Changes
- (2013) Fallen words
- (2012) Eminent Domains
- (2010) Parsing Variations
- (2008) Postlude for organ from Threshold of Light
- (2005) Lines of Desire
- (2004) Textures
- (1999) Colimaçon
- (1999) Three Piano Miniatures

=== Solo voice ===
- (2021) Seen & Unseen
- (2020) When I go away from you (The Taxi)
- (2012) Now Fatal Change
- (2012) My House, I Say
- (2009) The Sorrow of True Love
- (2009) Love raise your voice
- (2005) Three Motion Settings
- (2002) Sainte
- (1999) The Appointment
- (1998) The Tongue of Epigrams

=== Electroacoustic ===
- (2014) Scattered Rhymes (dance version; collaboration with Nick Wales)

== Discography ==
Date of release	Title	Performers	Works contained	Label
March 2026	Day of These Days: The British Isles Reflected in Song	Tristan Hambleton (bass-baritone), Simon Lepper (piano)	Three Motion Settings	Delphian; DCD34359-CD
November 2023	Music from the Coronation of Their Majesties King Charles III and Queen Camilla	Peter Holder (organ), Choirs of Westminster Abbey and His Majesty’s Chapel Royal, St James’s Palace, choristers from Methodist College Belfast and Truro Cathedral Choir, and an octet from the Monteverdi Choir (Andrew Nethsingha)	Coronation Agnus Dei	Decca; 5576767 (CD); 5576774 (vinyl)
May 2023	The Coronation of Their Majesties King Charles III and Queen Camilla	Peter Holder (organ), Choirs of Westminster Abbey and His Majesty’s Chapel Royal, St James’s Palace, choristers from Methodist College Belfast and Truro Cathedral Choir, and an octet from the Monteverdi Choir (Andrew Nethsingha)	Coronation Agnus Dei	Decca; 4859080
May 2023	The Coronation of Their Majesties King Charles III and Queen Camilla: The Service	Peter Holder (organ), Choirs of Westminster Abbey and His Majesty’s Chapel Royal, St James’s Palace, choristers from Methodist College Belfast and Truro Cathedral Choir, and an octet from the Monteverdi Choir (Andrew Nethsingha)	Coronation Agnus Dei	Decca; 5528383
December 2022	Reliquaries of the Sacred Feminine	Bella Voce (Brett Amundson)	Alleluia, laus et gloria	The College of St. Scholastica
November 2020	Letters	Chamber Choir Ireland, Irish Chamber Orchestra (Paul Hillier)	A Letter of Rights	Naxos; 8.574287
October 2020	For All the Saints: Anthems, Hymns & Motets	Jason Klein-Mendoza (organ), Sarah Parga (soprano), Choir of All Saints' Church, Beverly Hills (Craig Phillips)	We Remember Them	Gothic; G-49325
October 2020	The Phoenix	Thomas Hampson (baritone), Luca Pisaroni (bass-baritone), Chad Shelton (tenor), Rihab Chaieb (mezzo-soprano), Lauren Snouffer (soprano), Elizabeth Sutphen (soprano), Houston Grand Opera Orchestra, Houston Grand Opera Chorus, Houston Grand Opera Children's Chorus (Patrick Summers)	The Phoenix	Pentatone; PTC5186857
June 2020	All Things Common	Pacific Chorale, Salastina Music Society (Robert Istad)	All Things Common; Blessed Are They; Magnificat & Nunc Dimittis; Turn; Facing West; The Ecstasies Above; I Listen to the Stillness of You	Yarlung; YAR02592
March 2019	Songs of Renewal	Bath Camerata (Benjamin Goodson)	Threshold of Night	Somm Recordings; SOMMCD 0195
January 2019	Douce Dame Jolie	i Flautisi: The London Recorder Quartet	Virelai: Douce Dame Jolie	Supraphon; SU 4254-2
November 2018	Snow Queens	Juice Vocal Ensemble	Tell me	Resonus; RES10224
November 2017	Nostos: The Homecoming of Music	California State University, Fullerton Singers (Robert Istad)	Alleluia, laus et gloria (SATB version)	Yarlung; YAR80173
October 2017	Shattered Glass	Shattered Glass Ensemble	Chaâbi	Shattered Glass
February 2017	A Celestial Map of the Sky	Hallé, Hallé Youth Choir, The Manchester Grammar School Choir (Sir Mark Elder, Jamie Philips)	A Celestial Map of the Sky; Latent Manifest, Raï, Chaâbi, Suite from Heart of Darkness	NMC; D220
November 2016	Contemporary	Canta Volare (Jori Klomp)	Alleluia, laus et gloria	Canta Volare
June 2015	Song of the Stars	Wells Cathedral School Choralia (Christopher Finch)	A Light Exists in Spring; Alleluia, laus et gloria; Columba aspexit	Naxos; 8.573427
September 2014	Hodie! Contemporary Christmas Carols	Portsmouth Grammar School Chamber Choir (Sam Gladstone)	Ecce Puer	Convivium; CR024
November 2013	Bright Shadows	Concanenda	Locus iste	Concanenda; 5029385996086
September 2013	There is No Rose	Les Sirènes Female Chamber Choir	Bring rest, sweet dreaming child	Nimbus Alliance; NI6249
November 2012	The Organ of Guildford Cathedral	Katherine Dienes-Williams and David Davies	Colimaçon	Herald HAVP371
September 2012	The OPERA America Songbook	Various artists	My House, I Say	CD Baby 884501791311
June 2012	Variations for Judith	Melvyn Tan	Diomedes	NMC DL3009
March 2012	Winter: an evocation	Polyphony: Voices of New Mexico (Maxine Thévenot)	Bring rest, sweet dreaming child	Raven; ORA-934
December 2011	Love Raise Your Voice	Christine Howlett (soprano), Patrick Wood Uribe (violin), Holly Chatham (piano)	Love Raise Your Voice; Sainte	MSR Classics; MS1384
November 2011	The Spirit of Christmas Present	Elysian Singers (Sam Laughton)	Bring rest, sweet dreaming child	Meridian; CDE84601
October 2011	Acallam na Senórach: An Irish Colloquy	National Chamber Choir of Ireland (Paul Hillier)	Acallam na Senórach: An Irish Colloquy	Harmonia Mundi; HMU807486
September 2011	Sing Freedom!	Conspirare (Craig Hella Johnson)	Swing low, sweet chariot	Harmonia Mundi; HMU807525
April 2011	O Guiding Night	The Sixteen (Harry Christophers)	fleeting, God; Beloved all things ceased; O vera digna hostia	Coro COR16090
April 2011	Absolute Masters, Volume 2	Brno Philharmonic Orchestra	Maybe we have time	Smith & Co
January 2010	Talescapes	YL Male Voice Choir (Matti Hyökki)	Lamentation	Ondine ODE1155-2
June 2009	New Horizons	Ebor Singers (Paul Gameson)	Beatus auctor sæculi; O vera digna hostia	Boreas BMCD901
May 2009	A Company of Voices	Conspirare (Craig Hella Johnson)	Triptych (version for percussion)	Harmonia Mundi; HMU907534
April 2009	The NMC Songbook	Andrew Watts (countertenor), Benjamin Hulett (tenor), Lucy Wakeford (harp)	Darkness Visible	NMC D150
March 2009	Songs of the Sky	Britten Sinfonia	Raï	Signum Records SIGCD149
November 2008	A Song More Silent	The London Mozart Players (Nicolae Moldoveanu)	And there was a great calm	Avie AV2147
October 2008	Sanctum est verum lumen	National Youth Choirs of Great Britain (Michael Brewer)	I sleep, but my heart waketh	Delphian DCD34045
September 2008	Threshold of Night	Conspirare (Craig Hella Johnson)	Two Emily Dickinson Settings: Had I Not Seen the Sun / I Had No Time to Hate; The Ecstasies Above; Threshold of Night; Tal vez tenemos tiempo; Care Charminge Sleepe; Triptych	Harmonia Mundi; HMU807490
April 2008	Scattered Rhymes	The Orlando Consort, Estonian Philharmonic Chamber Choir (Paul Hillier)	Scattered Rhymes; Douce dame jolie	Harmonia Mundi; HMU807469
November 2007	Fiddlesticks	Madeleine Mitchell (violin), ensemblebash (percussion quartet)	Fragments from a Gradual Process	Signum Records SIGCD111
July 2006	The Quiet Room	John Lenehan (piano)	Lines of Desire	Sony Classical 82876821452
July 2006	MacMillan and his British Contemporaries	The Choir of New College, Oxford (Edward Higginbottom)	Surrexit Christus	Avie; AV2085
March 2006	Regina Caeli	The Choir of Corpus Christi College, Cambridge (Daniel Soper)	Sub tuum praesidium	Lammas LAMM188
February 2006	Tarik O'Regan: VOICES	The Choir of Clare College, Cambridge (Timothy Brown)	Three Motets from Sequence for St Wulfstan: Beatus auctor sæculi / O vera digna hostia / Tu claustra stripe regia; Magnificat and Nunc Dimittis: Variations for Choir; Two Upper Voice Settings: Bring rest sweet dreaming child / Columba aspexit; Dorchester Canticles: Cantate Domino / Deus Misereatur; Four Mixed Voice Settings: Gratias tibi / Ave Maria / Care Charminge Sleepe / Locus iste; Colimaçon for organ.	Collegium COLCD130
November 2005	New French Song	Alison Smart (soprano), Katharine Durran (piano)	Sainte	Metier MSVCD92100
September 2005	St John the Baptist	The Choir of St John's College, Oxford (Ryan Wigglesworth)	De Sancto Ioanne Baptista	Cantoris CRCD6080
February 2005	Love and Honour	The Choir of Queens' College, Cambridge (Samuel Hayes)	Cantate Domino; Tu claustra stirpe regia	Guild; GMCD7287
March 2004	Carmina Saeculi	The Elisabeth Singers, Hiroshima, Japan (Timo Nuoranne)	Gratias tibi	Brain Music OSBR20025

== Filmography ==
Date of release	Title	Performers	Label
September 2016	Mata Hari	Dutch National Ballet	EuroArts/Warner Classics; 0880242616289 (DVD); 0880242616241 (Blu-ray)

== Awards and recognition ==
- 2005 British Composer Award (Vocal category) for Sainte
- 2007 British Composer Award for (Liturgical category) for Threshold of Night
- 2009 Two Grammy Award nominations (Best Classical Album and Best Choral Performance) for Threshold of Night
- 2009 NEA Artistic Excellence Grant for Heart of Darkness
- 2011 Bronze Award at the 2011 World's Best Radio Programs Awards in New York.
- 2017 Elected to the board of Yaddo
- 2017 Honorary Fellowship of Pembroke College, Oxford
- 2024 Yaddo Artist Medal
