= Mark Shenton =

British journalist and theatre critic (born 1962)

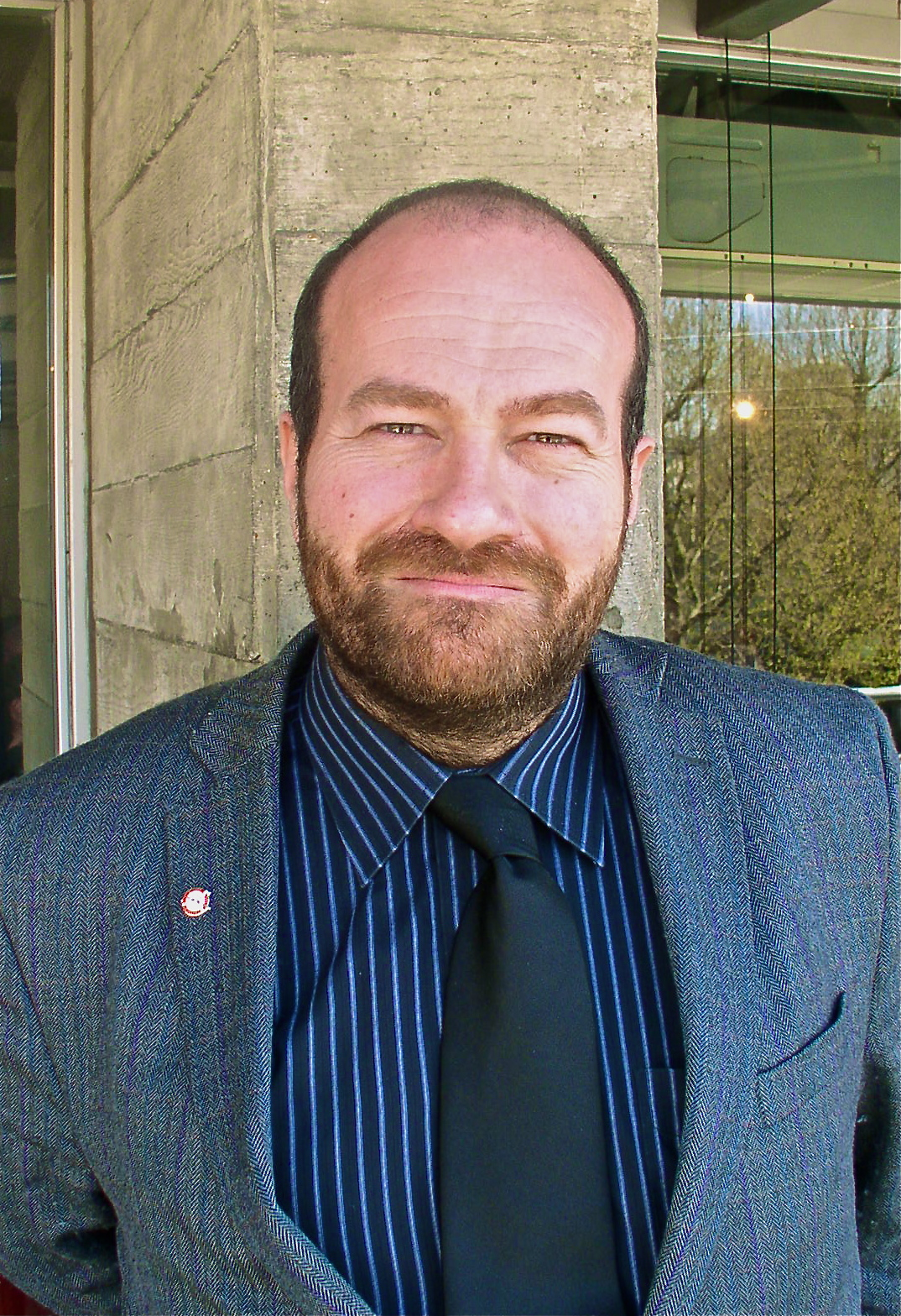
- Mark Shenton, 22 April 2010
- Born: Mark Charles Warren Shenton; 12 September 1962 (age 63); Johannesburg, South Africa
- Occupation: Critic
- Writing career
- Genre: theatre criticism
- Website: shentonstage.com

Mark Shenton (born 12 September 1962 in Johannesburg, South Africa) is a London-based British arts journalist and theatre critic. Between April 2002 and December 2013 he was chief Theatre Critic for the Sunday Express. He formerly wrote a daily blog for The Stage, where he was an associate editor, as well as reviews and features until March 2019.

== Education ==
Up to the age of 16, he was educated at St John's College, Johannesburg. He took O and A levels at Albany College, London then in 1982 took up studies at Corpus Christi College, Cambridge where he read law, graduating in 1985 and gaining his MA (Cantab) in 1987.

== Career ==
His first job in London came in 1986 at Dewynters plc where he edited and co-ordinated the publication of theatre programmes and souvenir brochures for West End and Broadway shows. He became editor for Arts and Entertainment at the Press Association in October 1990, and subsequently managing editor for Arts and Lifestyle, finance data and television listings, before becoming a freelance arts journalist in April 2002, specialising in theatre.

Shenton is the London correspondent for Playbill is associate editor of Theatrevoice.com and has written theatre blogs for The Guardian online, Broadway Direct, as well as contributing monthly features to West End theatre programmes.

Until December 2020 he was President of The Critics' Circle, having previously chaired the Circle's Drama section. In 2015, he was appointed joint lead theatre critic, with Natasha Tripney, of The Stage, a role which he left in 2018, when he became the paper's New York critic.

He also wrote a three-times weekly blog and reviews for LondonTheatre.co.uk until late 2020.

== Departure from the Sunday Express ==
On 5 December 2013, Shenton announced via a column in The Stage that he had been asked to leave the staff of the Sunday Express. as a result of some naked pictures of himself having been posted on a paywalled gay website without his consent. Suspecting the photographs to have been made publicly available by a former boyfriend, he acknowledged the content of the pictures as being "private, personal (but entirely legal)"; the pictures were taken years earlier in San Francisco. Editor Martin Townsend told him in late November that "serious allegation had been made" against him and, with the HR manager at a subsequent meeting, said the photographs had the potential to bring the Express into disrepute. Shenton described the decision to let him go as having "a certain irony" because the paper's owner Richard Desmond was a publisher of pornographic magazines during the period when the pictures were taken.

In a statement read out to an employment tribunal in August 2014, Shenton said his copy was sometimes dictated or changed without his consent, and fulfilling regular requests for free tickets potentially put at risk his professional relationship with theatre production's PRs. The Sunday Express disputed Shenton's account. In mid-October 2014, Shenton lost his claim for unfair dismissal, as he was a freelance paid a retainer, and thus "was not an employee within the meaning of the Employment Rights Act" meaning the tribunal had "no jurisdiction to hear the claim for unfair dismissal". The tribunal also ruled that Express Newspapers had not discriminated against him based on his sexual orientation and that Northern & Shell's "interests in the pornography industry" were irrelevant to the case. However, the company had "conducted an unfair process in terminating that contract, in that they withheld information from [Shenton] and they also gave inconsistent accounts of the reason for termination".

== Publications ==
Publications include:

- Harden's Theatregoers Handbook, co-authored with Roger Foss, Harden's Ltd (2004) ISBN 1-873721-65-X, ISBN 978-1-873721-65-0
