= The Liar (novel) =

1991 novel by Stephen Fry

- First edition cover
- Author: Stephen Fry
- Language: English
- Genre: Novel
- Set in: England, 1972–1980
- Publisher: William Heinemann
- Publication date: September 1991
- Publication place: United Kingdom
- Media type: Print (hardback & paperback)
- Pages: 240 pp (first edition, hardback)
- ISBN: 0-434-27191-8 (first edition, hardback) & ISBN 0-7493-0540-1 (paperback edition)
- OCLC: 59891543
- Dewey Decimal: 823.914
- LC Class: PR6056 .R88

The Liar (published 1991) is the first novel of British writer and actor Stephen Fry. The story is told out of chronological order but mostly follows the upper-class Englishman Adrian Healey through his years at public school, at Cambridge University, and afterwards. He excels at lying and entire chapters are later revealed to have been fictions. He ultimately ends up teaching at Cambridge as part of an old boys' club in British intelligence, which alleviates its boredom during the decline of the empire and end of the Cold War by partaking in make-believe espionage missions.

== Plot ==
The book opens as the protagonist, Adrian Healey, and his mentor, Professor Donald Trefusis, are at Mozart's birthplace in Salzburg, where Adrian witnesses the (staged) murder of their contact.

The narrative then shifts to Adrian's time at public school, where he has carefully groomed himself to convey the image of a witty, highly extroverted young gay man; however, despite his image, and, despite regarding sex as his "public pride", (Note: Page 18) he finds himself unable to express his love for the beautiful Hugo Cartwright. Another student, Paul Trotter (known as "Pigs Trotter" [sic]) hangs himself due to his unrequited love for Adrian. Adrian is shown later in the novel to be touchy on the subject of suicide as a result. Prior to Trotter's funeral, Adrian has a sexual encounter with Hugo while pretending to be asleep.

Adrian is later expelled from school for writing an article discussing the tradition of hidden behaviours that could be considered homosexual at public schools; consequently, he takes his A-level examinations in a Gloucestershire state school. Adrian claims to have run away from home due to unhappiness, subsequently becoming a rent boy, but it is later revealed, in an overheard conversation, that this probably never occurred.

Eventually, Adrian takes on the role of schoolmaster and has his first sexual encounter with a woman, a fellow member of staff at the school. The school years finish with Adrian's cricket team defeating the team of Hugo Cartwright, to whom Adrian no longer feels attracted. Just as Adrian and his team are about to leave the school at which Hugo is a master he admits to Hugo that he was awake during the incident before Trotter's funeral.

Adrian attends the fictional St Matthew's College and is given a challenge to produce something original by his tutor Professor Donald Trefusis. With the aid of his girlfriend – and later wife and acclaimed producer – Jenny de Woolf, and his housemate Gary, he writes and claims to have discovered a lost manuscript by Charles Dickens which dealt with the child sex trade. The discovery brings Jenny and the college fame, but it also results in a dialogue between Adrian and Hugo, who has become an alcoholic. Hugo believes that Adrian hates him, and points to Adrian's duplicity as proof. Adrian corrects him and the two leave things on a friendly note.

After graduation, Adrian attends a farcical meeting where he and other attendees discuss the arrest of Trefusis, who was arrested on charges of cottaging, sabotaging the footage of an onlooking BBC film crew. It is later revealed that he was actually undertaking a document exchange preceded by two kisses on the cheek as is custom in several European countries, such as Hungary.

Adrian joins Trefusis in a forced sabbatical, which they claim to spend studying the fricative shift in English. In actuality, the year is spent in a game of espionage in which they must acquire the parts for Mendax (from the Latin adjective meaning "lying, deceptive"), a lie-inhibiting device from his Hungarian friend Szabó.

A showdown results with Adrian's uncle David (Sir David Pearce of MI5) and Trefusis, during which it is revealed that Pearce's aide was a double agent working for Trefusis. It is also revealed that the murders that Adrian witnessed were staged to scare Trefusis into giving Mendax to MI5, and that Mendax was fictional.

Subsequently, Adrian overhears a conversation between Trefusis and Pearce where it is revealed that the espionage adventure was just a game to counter boredom, meaning that several parts of the story were untrue. Adrian remembers a letter written to him by de Woolf saying that while young girls grew up, young boys did not, making their education irrelevant and just a game.

The book concludes with Adrian, now a Cambridge fellow, recruiting a new spy for a new game.

== Autobiographical elements ==
The novel is semi-autobiographical and many scenes echo experiences later recounted in Fry's memoir, Moab is My Washpot. The character Trefusis was created by Fry for several humorous radio broadcasts on BBC Radio 4's Loose Ends.

== Conceits ==
The espionage portions of the book are written in italics, which stop at Adrian's graduation. The book features a third-person omniscient narrator. The narrator knows, for example, about David Pearce's annoyance at Dickon Lister's ignorance of the story of Helen of Troy. Starting with chapter four, in keeping with popular spy fiction, the characters refer to each other by code names; in this case, the names used are from the Trojan War:

- Adrian is "Telemachus", the name of the son of Odysseus in the Odyssey
- Professor Donald Trefusis is "Odysseus"
- Istvan Moltaj is "Patrochlus" (sic, in Greek Πάτροκλος, not Πάτροχλος)
- Szabó is "Helen", the catalyst of the Trojan War (pronounced /ˈʒɑːboʊ/ rather than [ˈsɒboː] on the audiobook)
- His nephews are "Castor" and "Pollux"
- Salzburg is the "walls of Illium"

The author is known for his interest in the English language (see Fry's Planet Word). In a post on his blog, Fry talks about the evolving language, including his interest in "verbing" nouns (nouns used as verbs). He also reproaches grammar pedants. In the book there are several experiments with the English language, mostly used in the dialogue. These range from several nouns used as verbs (e.g. "You everything me" or "you sir me"), Americanisms (e.g. "burglarised" or "gotten") to polysyndeton (e.g. "Tom and Adrian and Pigs Trotter" (Note: Page 37)). In the book, at school, Adrian actively tries new vocabulary. (Note: Page 37) As a spy he is told off by Trefusis for saying "it is them" instead of "it is they" (before Trefusis acknowledges that it is obnoxious pedantry to care) and complains to Trefusis about the habit of another (less erudite) character of overusing the suffix "-ise" like an American. (Note: page 219: "God knows what new linguistic macé-doine he's going to serve up next")

== Reception ==
The book is noted for its wit and humour, as well as its often outrageous references to various homosexual experiences.

== Legacy ==
The bar on level three of the University of Dundee Student Union building is named after the book, as Fry was Rector of the university from 1992 to 1998.

A feature film adaptation of the same name is in development, directed by Tony Hagger, written by Stephen Fry and Tony Hagger, starring Asa Butterfield as Adrian Healey, Charles Dance as Tickford, Rupert Everett as Humphrey Biffen, Tom Wilkinson as Trefusis, Sally Phillips as Beryl, and David Walliams as Hesketh-Harvey.
