= John Thaxter =

British theatre critic

John Thaxter (11 February 1927 – 30 January 2012) was a British theatre critic.

Originally an IT professional at British Telecom, he turned to theatre criticism late in life, initially writing reviews for the Richmond and Twickenham Times and subsequently for The Stage and British Theatre Guide. He was a member of the London Critics' Circle. He was also a regular contributor to theatre-related articles in the English Wikipedia.

Thaxter lived in Twickenham. Three times married and twice widowed, he is survived by two children.
