= White Bear Theatre =

Pub theatre in London, England

Coordinates: 51°29′12.5″N 0°6′28″W

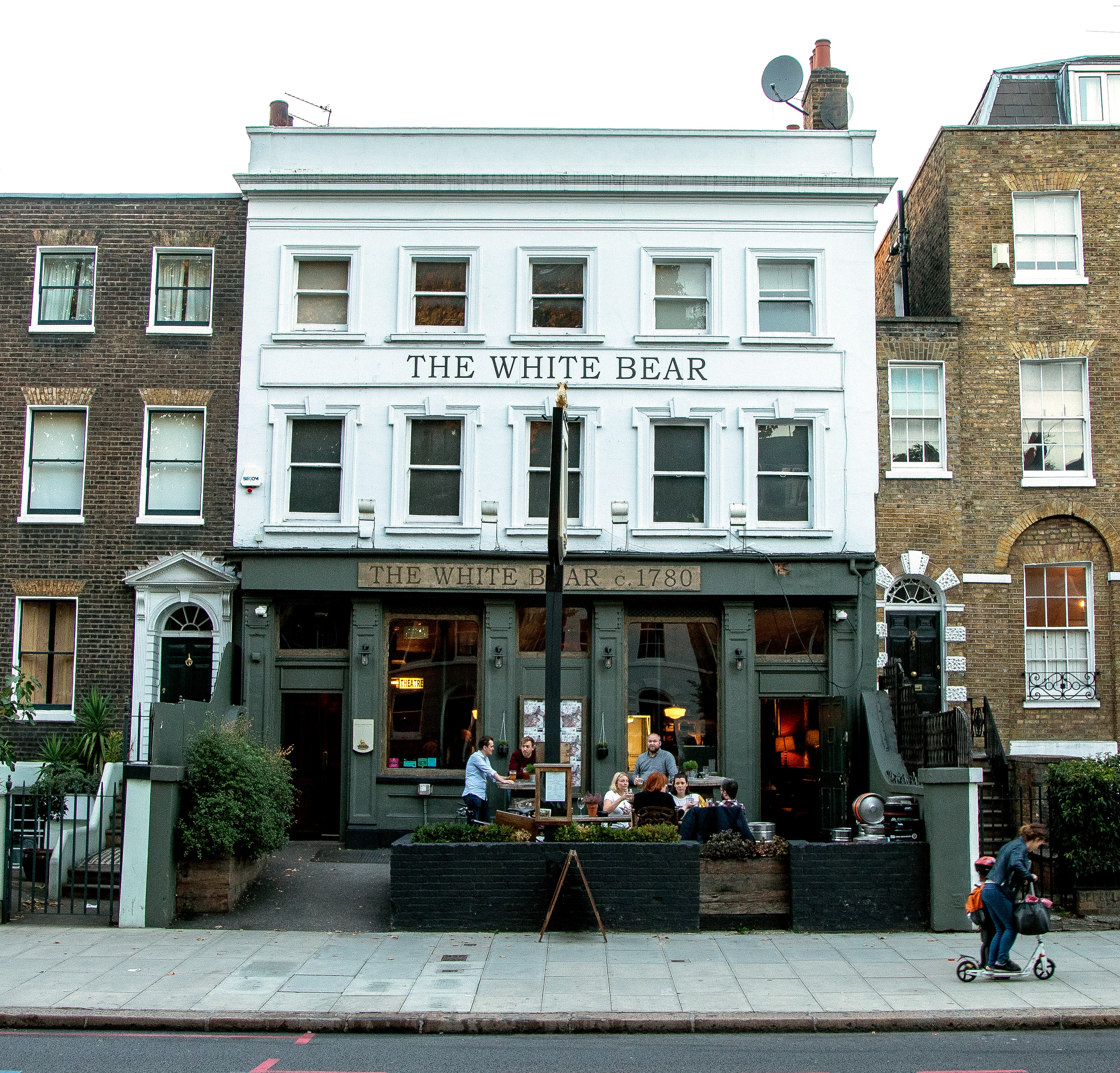
- Interactive map of White Bear Theatre
- Address: Kennington Park Road; London, SE11; United Kingdom
- Capacity: 50
- Type: Fringe theatre
- Public transit: Kennington

Construction
- Opened: 1988; 38 years ago

Website
- whitebeartheatre.co.uk

The White Bear Theatre is a fringe theatre founded in 1988 at the White Bear pub in Kennington, London, and run by artistic director and founder Michael Kingsbury. It is one of London's leading pub theatres, as well as one of the longest established, dedicated since inception to both new writing and to its Lost Classics Project, which focuses on productions of obscure historical works.

== The Lost Classics Project ==
Alongside the theatre's new writing output, the long-running Lost Classics Project focuses on the production of obscure, underperformed or unperformed plays from previous generations.

In the modern history strand this has included the first uncensored productions of two of John Osborne's supposedly lost early plays (Personal Enemy and The Devil Inside Him), J.P. Donleavy's The Ginger Man, together with a successful revival of Sylvia Rayman's long-unperformed all-female play Women of Twilight.

The project's historical strand has been praised by academics for featuring "an extensive range of non-Shakespearean plays" and for seeking to "extend the repertory beyond the select group of frequently revived plays". Alongside the Read Not Dead project at Shakespeare's Globe and the Royal Shakespeare Company's Jacobethan seasons, the Lost Classics Project is considered one of the three most influential attempts to "reshape the twenty-first-century 'early modern repertory'", with past productions including the first modern performances of Westward Ho by Thomas Dekker and John Webster, and Ben Jonson's final play, The Magnetic Lady.

== Awards ==
- 2012 Empty Space Peter Brook Awards – Mark Marvin Rent Subsidy Award: Instant Classics Company in association with White Bear Theatre
