= King's Head Theatre =

Oldest operating pub theatre in the UK

- Official Logo

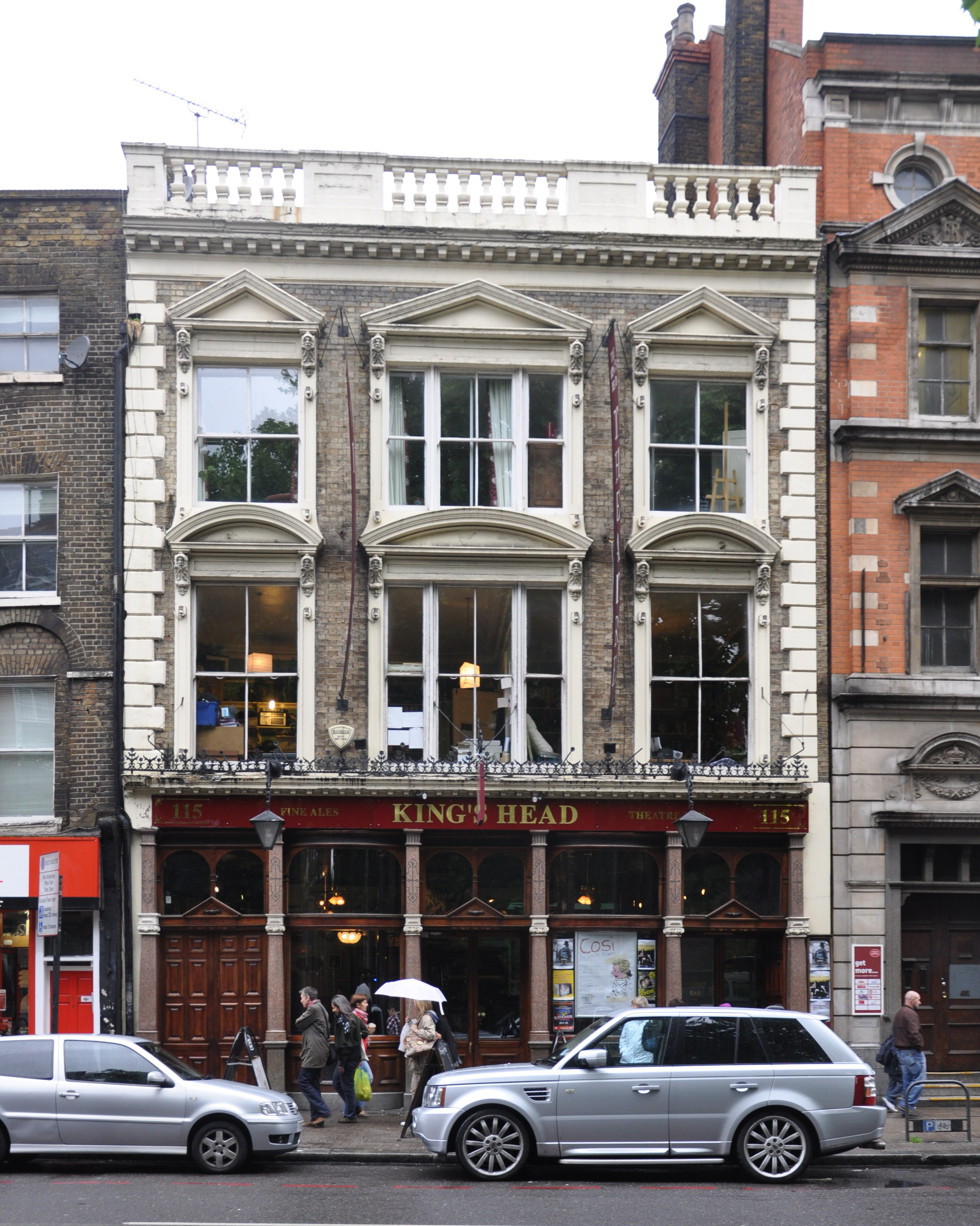
- King's Head Theatre in June 2011
- Interactive map of King's Head Theatre
- Address: Upper Street; Islington; London, N1; United Kingdom
- Coordinates: 51.538056°N 0.102778°W
- Seating type: 220 Seat Auditorium, 50 Seat Cabaret Space
- Type: Off-West End Theatre
- Production: LGBTQ+ Theatre
- Public transit: Angel; Essex Road Highbury & Islington

Construction
- Opened: 1970; 56 years ago
- Rebuilt: 2024

Website
- kingsheadtheatre.com

The King's Head Theatre, founded in 1970 by Dan Crawford, is an off-West End venue in London. The original venue was the oldest operating pub theatre in the UK. In 2024, the pub theatre, and the King's Head Theatre now operates from a purpose-built 220-seat space next door to the original venue. The theatre focusses on producing LGBTQ+ work that is joyful, irreverent, colourful and queer. It is currently led by executive director and Acting CEO Sofi Berenger.

== Background ==
The original theatre was located in the back room behind the bar at the King's Head pub on Upper Street, in the London Borough of Islington. The theatre was housed in a Victorian building, but a public house, originally known as The King's Head Tavern, has been on the same site, opposite St Mary's Church, since 1543. The theatre was previously used as an old boxing ring and pool hall. The theatre's reconstruction in 2007–2008 increased both the stage size and seating capacity, with the addition of new seating.

Dan Crawford ran the venue for 35 years until his death in 2005. His wife and long-serving associate artistic director Stephanie Sinclaire took over with help from those who had worked with Crawford. She mounted 20 galas in the first year at the theatre with the help of Caroline Smith and longtime supporters such as Maureen Lipman, Sir John Mortimer, Linda Marlowe, Sharon D Clarke, Clive Rowe, Janie Dee and others, and pulled the theatre out of debt. In 2007, Sinclaire was joined by the Tony Award-winning New York producer, Steven M. Levy, who has been serving as the company's Executive Producer. Levy and Sinclaire got the theatre producing for a year and presented several musical and play premieres.

The atmosphere Crawford created in 1970 was intended to be enjoyed by an interesting, cosmopolitan and cultural audience. Crawford disagreed with the introduction of decimal currency; for over twenty years after decimalisation of the pound (1971), the bar continued to show prices and charge for drinks in pre-decimal currency. However, the management later decided to introduce computerised tills, while keeping the antique till as the main focal point in the pub.

== History ==
=== 1970–2005 ===
The King's Head has presented a wide array of productions: musicals, stand-up comedy, revues, contemporary forgotten classics, and new work by both new and established playwrights. Under the Crawfords' leadership The King's Head won multiple awards and numerous productions transferred to mainstream West End and Broadway theatres, including Mr Cinders, Wonderful Town starring Maureen Lipman and Tom Stoppard's Artist Descending a Staircase. Since his death, productions have included the world stage premiere of Leonard Bernstein's Peter Pan, directed by Stephanie Sinclaire, which transferred to the Lobero Theatre in California. Fucking Men also ran at the theatre for nine months in the late night slot as well as the main time slot before Steven Levy transferred it to The Arts Theatre.

A documentary about the theatre, The King's Head: A Maverick in London (2006), was produced by Dragonfly Films and Xi Pictures, and co-directed by Stephanie Sinclaire and Jason Figgis. It ran on SkyARTS World for three years.

In 2002, Crawford and Sinclaire won the Queen's Golden Jubilee Award for their contribution to the Arts, and the Trainee Resident Director Scheme that they had begun won the Royal Anniversary Trust Award.

=== 2010–2020 ===
In March 2010, Opera Up Close founded by Adam Spreadbury-Maher and Robin Norton-Hale became resident company of the theatre. Spreadbury-Maher was also appointed artistic director in the same year. In October 2010, it was announced that the theatre would become "London's Little Opera House", the first new opera house in London for over 40 years. The first opera performed was Barber of Seville (or Salisbury), an adaption of Rossini set in the times of Jane Austen. Also in October 2010, Mark Ravenhill became associate director, and Jonathan Miller joined existing patrons Joanna Lumley, Janie Dee, Tom Stoppard and Alan Parker.

The theatre continued to receive multiple transfers and awards. In 2011, the theatre won an Olivier Award for Best New Opera Performance for Opera Up Close's La Bohème, and the following year Vieux Carre by Tennessee Williams received its UK premiere before transferring to the West End. Other notable productions that premiered at the King's Head Theatre include Shock Treatment – the sequel to The Rocky Horror Picture Show – and Trainspotting, the Edinburgh Festival and touring hit which has had over 900 performances.

In the period before the COVID-19 pandemic, the theatre started to build its reputation for producing LGBTQ+ work, with notable titles including 5 Guys Chillin and Kevin Elyot's Coming Clean.

Adam Spreadbury-Maher stepped down as artistic director in 2020.

=== 2021-2023 ===
In 2021, Mark Ravenhill was appointed artistic director of the theatre. The theatre celebrated its 50th anniversary with KHT50: Barstools to Broadway - a week of work bringing together highlights from the past 50 years and featuring work from Timberlake Wartenbaker, Audrey Sheffield, Dame Harriet Walter, Gemma Whelan, Tom Stoppard, Stephen Jeffreys, Annabel Arden, Tim Luscombe, Bryony Lavery, Abigail Anderson, Victoria Wood, Annabel Leventon, Bill Russel & Janet Hood.

After the pandemic, the theatre renewed its focus on showcasing LGBTQ+ work. In an interview, Ravenhill stated: "I'm excited to move forward the LGBTQ+ work of the King's Head Theatre. Historically, the stories of gay men have tended to dominate and while we will continue to tell some of those stories, I'm looking forward to exploring the full spectrum of experiences symbolised by the rainbow flag. We want to be the home for a new wave of diverse queer theatre makers."

In 2023, the theatre hosted a series of Guest Artistic Directors: Isabel Adomakoh Young, Tom Ratcliffe, Tania Azevedo, and David Cumming.

The King's Head Pub Theatre closed its doors after 53 years on 13 August 2023, with a special event starring Steven Berkoff, Mark Gatiss, Ian Hallard, Dame Janet Suzman, Linda Marlowe, Freddie Love, Saul Boyer and Bold Mellon.

=== 2024–present: New theatre ===
On 5 January 2024, The King's Head Theatre opened at its new building, 116p Upper St, Islington Square, under the direction of new executive director and Acting CEO Sofi Berenger. This new opening marked the upgrade of the venue from a small pub theatre to a purpose-built space seating over 200 audience members. The first show to run in the new venue was Exhibitionists by Shaun McKenna and Andrew Van Sickle.

As well as its new, much larger auditorium, the new theatre features a 50-seat cabaret space known as 4Below, used for solo shows, drag, and cabaret performances, as well as readings and other one-off events. The venue also has two bars and a small playtext bookshop/exchange.

The new King's Head Theatre continues to stage predominantly LGBTQ+ work, including many transfers from the Edinburgh Fringe Festival.

In November, the new venue will continue the pub theatre's old tradition of producing an annual family pantomime - the only pantomime in Islington. The first of these will be Cinderella, produced with the nearby Little Angel Theatre.

In 2025, the new theatre will host a new season including its first full-length musicals, all three of which are European or World premiers.
