= John Barrett (actor) =

British actor (1910–1983)

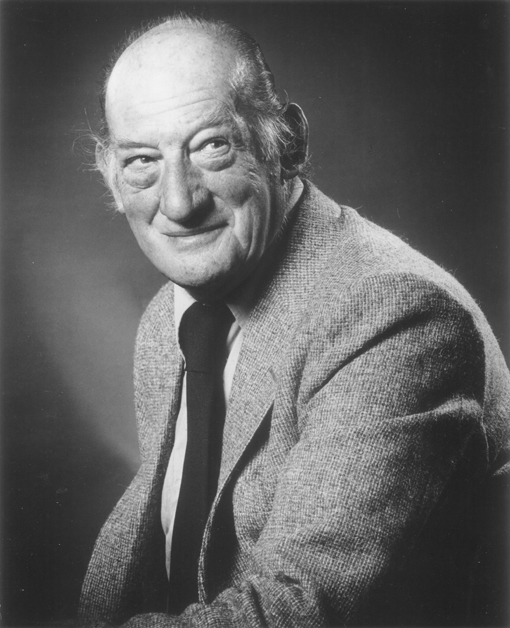
- Born: Jack Elvyn Barrett; 18 February 1910; Rochdale, Lancashire, England
- Died: 22 May 1983 (aged 73); London, England
- Occupation: Actor
- Years active: 1958–1983

Jack Elvyn Barrett (18 February 1910 – 22 May 1983) was a British actor on film, television and stage, best known for his roles as Smellie Ibbotson in The Dustbinmen and Hylda Baker's father in Not On Your Nellie.

== Biography ==
Born in Rochdale in 1910, Barrett worked in a family business there, and in the 1930s began working in the theatre. He started as an assistant stage manager, and at different times worked as an actor, stage manager, director and actor-manager. Before and during World War II he produced and acted in local productions in Rochdale. Following the war, he joined weekly repertory companies across England, working in places such as Birmingham, Rugby, Bexhill-on-Sea and Hastings in Sussex, Portsmouth in Hampshire, Bournemouth in Dorset, and Burnley in Lancashire.
In the mid 1950s, he made his first appearances on screen and thereafter had frequent roles on television and in films. In the 1960s and 1970s, he acted in London at the Royal Court Theatre, Savoy Theatre and the National Theatre under directors like William Gaskill, Michael Wearing, Lindsay Anderson, Richard Eyre and Bill Bryden.

The Daily Mirror wrote in 1976 that Barrett, then aged 66, "has the sort of career that makes him the envy of many younger actors". In 1968, he played the lead role in a revival of D. H. Lawrence's play A Collier's Friday Night, with reviewers saying, "The director, Peter Gill, elicits admirable style and even ensemble from a first-rate cast including John Barrett as the collier, Anne Dyson as his wife, Victor Henry as the son, and Jenifer Armitage as Maggie." "The characters have the ring of truth about them. Old Lambert (John Barrett) is marked physically and mentally by his work at the coalface. ... All are excellently portrayed in this first-rate production." In 1970, Barrett played the lead role in Barry Hines's play Billy's Last Stand. One reviewer wrote, "Both John Barrett as Billy and Ian McKellen as Darkly give powerful performances, each sombre, thoughtful, balanced and real, though, by the end, the melodrama seems even to have seeped through to their performances." Another said, "The acting is first-rate. ... John Barrett is wonderfully solid and self-satisfied at the start as an innocent faced by capitalism; and in his final gritty resignation to his fate the actor never puts an eyelid wrong."

== Filmography ==
=== Film ===
Year	Title	Role	Notes
1959	Jack the Ripper	Onlooker at 2nd Murder Scene	Uncredited
1960	Saturday Night and Sunday Morning	Man in Cafe	Uncredited
1962	A Prize of Arms	Publican at Window	Uncredited
1965	City Under the Sea	Third Fisherman	Uncredited
1966	The Witches	Mr. Glass	Uncredited
1966	The Trygon Factor	Guide	
1967	Far from the Madding Crowd	Joseph Poorgrass	
1968	Star!	Speaker at Hyde Park	Uncredited
1972	Up the Chastity Belt	1st Peasant	
1972	Nearest and Dearest	Joshua Pledge	
1973	O Lucky Man!	Bill	
1973	Malachi's Cove	Polwarth	
1974	Our Cissy	Stan Butler	
1974	Smokey Joe's Revenge	Bill Bassett	
1976	Robin and Marian	Jack	
1976	It Shouldn't Happen to a Vet	Crump	
1976	The Eagle Has Landed	Laker Armsby	
1979	Porridge	Hedley	
1979	Tess	Old Dairyhand	
1979	The Quiz Kid	Old Man	
1981	The French Lieutenant's Woman	Dairyman	
1982	Remembrance	Jimmy	
1982	The Missionary	Old Man outside Hotel	

=== Television ===
Year	Title	Role	Notes
1957	The Machine Breakers	Foreman of Jury	
1958	Quatermass and the Pit		
1963	Ghost Squad	Melchek	Series 2, Episode 14 - Interrupted Requiem
1964	The Massingham Affair	George Sugden	4 episodes
1966–1970	Mystery and Imagination - Casting the Runes	Coachman	
1968	The War of Darkie Pilbeam	Toddy Bartholomew	
1969–1970	The Dustbinmen	Smellie Ibbotson (main role)	
1971	Play for Today	Billy (main role)	Billy's Last Stand
1971	One More On Top		ITV play by Jonathan Hales
1972	Clochemerle	Poipanel	
1973	The Jensen Code	Mr. Buckle	
1974–1975	Not On Your Nellie	Jed Pickersgill (main role)	Series 1 and 2, 13 episodes
1976	Play for Today	Ben Packman (main role)	Packman's Barn
1976	Shadows	Eli (main role)	The Inheritance
1978–80	All Creatures Great and Small	Kitson / Mr. Dent	
1980	God's Wonderful Railway	Robbie Grant (main role)	Clear Ahead, 3 episodes
1980	Juliet Bravo	Mr.Israel Smethurst (Lollipop man)	(Series 1, Ep. 5 – 'Trouble At T’Mill')
1961,1980	Coronation Street	Mr. Stark / Monty Shawcross	
1982	Objects of Affection (Alan Bennett plays)	Mr. Joey Wyman (main role)	Rolling Home

=== Selected stage performances ===
Year	Title	Author	Theatre	Role	Director
1939	The Bear	Anton Chekhov	The Curtain Theatre, Rochdale		Jack E. Barrett
1939	Laodice	Wallace B. Nichols	The Curtain Theatre, Rochdale	Euphorion, Lord of the Syrian Court	E. Nuttall Butterworth
1942	The Two Gentlemen of Verona	William Shakespeare	The Curtain Theatre, Rochdale		Jack E. Barrett
1946	While the Sun Shines	Terence Rattigan	De La Warr Pavilion, Bexhill-on-Sea	Duke	
1952	A Streetcar Named Desire	Tennessee Williams	White Rock Pavilion, Hastings		
1953	Charley's Aunt	Brandon Thomas	Theatre Royal, Portsmouth	Brassett	Carl Clopet
1954	Grand National Night	Campbell Christie and Dorothy Christie	Victoria Theatre, Burnley	Morton (the butler)	John Barrett
1954	White Sheep of the Family	John Hay Beith and L. du Garde Peach	Victoria Theatre, Burnley	James Winter	John Barrett
1954	Piccadilly Alibi	Guy Paxton and Edward Hoile	Victoria Theatre, Burnley		
1954	When We Are Married	J. B. Priestley	Victoria Theatre, Burnley		John Barrett
1954	Dial M for Murder	Frederick Knott	Victoria Theatre, Burnley		John Barrett
1954	Babes in the Wood (pantomime)		Victoria Theatre, Burnley	Robber	Morris Parsons
1968	A Collier's Friday Night	D. H. Lawrence	Royal Court Theatre, London	Old Lambert, collier (main role)	Peter Gill
1969	Saved	Edward Bond	Royal Court Theatre, London	main role	William Gaskill
1969	Early Morning	Edward Bond	Royal Court Theatre, London	Gladstone	William Gaskill
1970	Billy's Last Stand	Barry Hines	Theatre Upstairs, Royal Court, London	Billy (main role)	Michael Wearing
1971	The Changing Room	David Storey	Royal Court Theatre, London	Harry	Lindsay Anderson
1972	Lloyd George Knew My Father	William Douglas-Home	Savoy Theatre, London	Robertson	Robin Midgley
1974	Bingo	Edward Bond	Royal Court Theatre, London	Old man	Jane Howell & John Dove
1978	Lark Rise	Flora Thompson	Cottesloe, National Theatre		Bill Bryden and Sebastian Graham-Jones
1980	Hamlet	William Shakespeare	Royal Court Theatre, London	Gravedigger	Richard Eyre
1981	The Crucible	Arthur Miller	Comedy Theatre, London		Bill Bryden
