= The Sea (play) =

1973 play

- Poster of the original production
- Original language: English
- Written by: Edward Bond
- Setting: East coast of England, 1907

Premiere
- Date: 22 May 1973
- Place: Royal Court Theatre, London

The Sea is a 1973 play by Edward Bond. It is a comedy set in a small seaside village in rural East Anglia during the Edwardian period and draws from some of the themes of Shakespeare's The Tempest. It was well-received by critics.

== Plot summary ==
Set in 1907, the play begins with a tempestuous storm in which a well-known and loved member of the community drowns. It then explores the reactions of the villagers and the attempts by two young lovers to break away from the constraints of the hierarchical, and sometimes irrational, society.

At the same time, the town's draper struggles with abuse and bullying from the town's "First Lady", Mrs. Rafi. Believing that aliens from another planet have arrived to invade the city, he had refused to help the drowning man's friend's attempts to save him and eventually goes stark raving mad.

== Original production ==
The play was originally produced at the Royal Court Theatre on 22 May 1973, directed by William Gaskill.

- Willy Carson - Simon Rouse
- Evens - Alan Webb
- Hatch - Ian Holm
- Hollarcut - Mark McManus
- Vicar - Jeremy Wilkin
- Carter - Anthony Langdon
- Thompson - Simon Cord
- Louise Rafi - Coral Browne
- Rose Jones - Diana Quick
- Jessica Tilehouse - Gillian Martell
- Mafanwy Price - Susan Williamson
- Jilly - Adrienne Byrne
- Rachel - Barbara Ogilvy
- Davis - Margaret Lawley

== Revivals ==
In 1991 it was produced by the National Theatre, directed by Sam Mendes, with Judi Dench as Mrs. Rafi and Ken Stott as Hatch. In 2000, Sean Holmes directed a production at The Minerva Theatre Chichester, with Susan Engel as Mrs. Rafi and Michael Gould as Hatch. In 2008, Jonathan Kent produced the play at the Theatre Royal Haymarket, with Eileen Atkins as Mrs. Rafi and David Haig as Hatch. This production was reviewed positively in Evening Standard. It was also produced by the 1812 Theatre Company at Helmsley Arts Centre in Helmsley, Yorkshire in 2009. It was produced by Eda Holmes in 2014, with Fiona Reid's performance as Louise Rafi highly praised in The Buffalo News and Toronto Star.

In 2007, in a New York production Off-Broadway, The Actors Company Theatre (TACT) staged the play.

== Reception ==
Ann Marie Demling wrote in 1983 that The Sea enjoyed popular and critical acclaim, and that in the play, Bond "most clearly and articulately expresses a vision that was only suggested in The Pope's Wedding and Saved." Lawrence MacDonald praised the dynamic between Carson and Hatch, as well as the character of Evens. However, MacDonald said that the play's eight scenes "don't quite add up to a total, self cementing structure" and derided the scenes "between Willy Carson and Rose Jones. They come across as fiat and banal concessions to the boy meets girl syndrome."

Ian Shuttleworth wrote for the Financial Times, "His comedy is frequently as broad as a 1970s television sitcom, and his passages of more profound comment tend to interrupt this silliness obtrusively rather than to sneak in under its Trojan-horse cover. [...] The Sea constantly declares that it has depths, but Bond never summons the resolve to trawl them properly". Colin Dabkowski of The Buffalo News wrote, "For this particularly bleak brand of existentialist drama to sit side-by-side with such finely calibrated mannerist comedy is unusual but often thrilling. [...] by placing haunting reflections on the experience of life in a dead-end seaside town in such proximity to slapstick comedy, Bond seems to be making a statement on the power of theater as an antidote to the void, or at least a distraction from it." Chicago Tribune's Sid Smith billed The Sea in 1994 as a "dense, erratic, compelling piece of theater", as well as "a feast of acting opportunity and emotional depths" that "gracefully wends back and forth between [tragedy and comedy]", but Smith criticized some of the acting in the Cypress Group performance he attended.

In 1999, Ian Stuart of the University of Southern California described the play as "excellent". Mark Ravenhill called Mrs Raffi "terrifyingly hilarious [...] ruling a small seaside community with an iron fist and an acid tongue." In 2007, Neil Genzlinger of The New York Times dubbed The Sea a "funny-in-that-British-way" play. The following year, Paul Taylor said in The Independent that the play has "hilarious" and "haunting" aspects. Susannah Clapp called it "both magnificent and a mess [...] it's not an indictment of a play which is both a picture of a world on the point of destruction and a satire on the British social set-up to say that it doesn't hang together: does King Lear exactly cohere?" Charles Spencer of The Telegraph described the work as a "classic piece of English eccentricity".

Molly Flatt of The Guardian criticized the incidental characters as cliches but still wrote of The Sea, "It works. It made me laugh, and feel sad, and really think about, as Bond himself puts it, 'the moral and political paths people could take in the situation the world was in'." Paul Levy of The Wall Street Journal (reviewing Kent's production) criticized the play as lacking coherence, but found the hymn-singing at the funeral "gloriously funny", and praised the performances of Atkins, Haig, and Marcia Warren. In a 2014 article for The Wall Street Journal, Terry Teachout called the play a "masterpiece" deserving of more productions. Grant Golden of Buffalo Rising said that while The Sea is "a little less than the sum of its estimable parts", portions of it "have stuck around in my head for a good deal longer than I thought they would." He called Mrs. Rafi's final appraisal of herself "simultaneously humorous and touching".

Variety's Karen Fricker had reservations about the first act but stated that the play "[achieves] the required comic-tragic-pathetic grandeur in the second-act funeral scene", the waterside setting of which provides (in the critic's opinion) "a jarring but effective tonal contrast to the scene’s arch sendup of Englishness". Fricker argued, "Bond is clearly no fan of the red pen, and the play suffers for it. But there is exhilaration in the breadth of his reference, social conscience and theatrical imagination". Jon Kaplan of Now praised the play as "thoughtful and incisive" and said that the Shaw Festival's acting ensemble "know how to mine the work's text and emotional subtext". The Globe and Mail's J. Kelly Nestruck praised Hatch as Bond's "most riveting theatrical creation". Tamara McCarthy said of The Sea, "The complex characters, the poetry of the piece, and the absolute ripping humour resonated with me for quite a while afterward.” Robert Cushman of National Post lauded Hatch and Mrs. Rafi as "major creations", referring to the latter's speech about her future self as "one of the great speeches in modern drama"; Cushman also praised the funeral scene as "brilliantly grotesque". While criticizing the play's ending as a moralistic discussion between three minor characters, he still dubbed the play a "near-masterpiece".

Some critics have been less laudatory. Toronto Star's Richard Ouzounian wrote that the "writing throughout is brilliantly witty, yet savagely political", and that the "battered old rum-pot [offers] some astonishingly valid philosophical views of the universe" near the ending. But he also said, "The Sea is full of wonderful moments, but it’s not a unified wondrous experience. Is it Edward Bond’s fault or Eda Holmes’s? I don’t know." The Guardian's Michael Billington lauded the acting in Kent's production as acting "of the highest order" and wrote that "Bond achieves moments of limpid poetry as when the local wise fool announces 'in the end life laughs at death'. But [...] I'm not sure the story is strong enough to bear the cosmic weight imposed on it." Time Out's Kris Vera said that the thread on Hatch's fear of alien invasion "has an unfortunate resonance amid an increasingly ridiculous political season" but "sits uncomfortably alongside" other parts of the play.

== Bibliography ==
- Edward Bond: Bond Plays: 2, Methuen, 1978. ISBN 0-413-39270-8
