= Lear (play) =

Play by Edward Bond

- Poster of original production
- Written by: Edward Bond
- Original language: English

Premiere
- Date premiered: 29 September 1971
- Place premiered: Royal Court Theatre, London

Lear is a 1971 three-act play by the British dramatist Edward Bond. It is a rewrite of William Shakespeare's King Lear. The play was first produced at the Royal Court Theatre in 1971, featuring Harry Andrews in the title role. It was revived by the Royal Shakespeare Company in 1982 with Bob Peck, and revived again at the Crucible Theatre, Sheffield, in 2005 with Ian McDiarmid.

Bond, a socialist, was attempting to reverse modern trends which focused on the Shakespeare play as an artistic experience, at the expense of more practical elements of social critique. By creating a politically effective piece from a similar story, he was more likely to cause people to question their society and themselves, rather than simply to have an uplifting aesthetic experience. According to one critic, his plays "are not meant merely to entertain but to help to bring about change in society". Also, according to Hilde Klein, "Bond argues that Shakespeare gave an answer to the problems of his particular society, which is not valid for our age."

In Bond's play, Lear is a paranoid autocrat, building a wall to keep out imagined "enemies". His daughters Bodice and Fontanelle rebel against him, causing a bloody war. Lear becomes their prisoner and goes on a journey of self-revelation. He is blinded and haunted by the ghost of a Gravedigger's Boy, whose kindness towards the old King led to his murder. Eventually Lear, after becoming a prophet, makes a gesture toward dismantling the wall he began. This gesture leads to his death, which offers hope as an example of practical activism.

The play also features a character called Cordelia, wife of the murdered Gravedigger's Boy who becomes a Stalinist-type dictator herself.

Lear features some punishing scenes of violence, including knitting needles being plunged into a character's eardrum, a bloody on-stage autopsy and a machine which sucks out Lear's eyeballs. The play's emphasis on violence and brutality was mentioned in mixed reviews by top critics. Although some critics praised its message against violence (and its cast), others questioned whether the play was convincing enough to garner the reaction it sought from the audience.

== Original production ==
The English Stage Company presented the play at the Royal Court Theatre, where it opened on 29 September 1971, directed by William Gaskill. The cast was as follows:

- Foreman - Geoffrey Hinsliff
- 1st Workman - Matthew Guinness
- 2nd Workman - Struan Rodger
- 3rd Workman - Ron Pember
- Soldier - Bob Hoskins
- Lear - Harry Andrews
- Bodice - Carmel McSharry
- Fontanelle - Rosemary McHale
- Warrington - Anthony Douse
- Old Counsellor - George Howe
- Engineer - Gareth Hunt
- Firing Squad Officer - William Hoyland
- Bishop - Gareth Hunt
- Duke of North - Eric Allen
- Duke of Cornwall - Alec Heggie
- Soldier A - Bob Hoskins
- The Gravedigger's Boy - Mark McManus
- The Gravedigger's Boy's Wife - Celestine Randall
- Carpenter - Oliver Cotton
- Sergeant - Bob Hoskins
- Soldier D at the Gravedigger Boy's House - Ray Barron
- Soldier E at the Gravedigger Boy's House - Geoffrey Hinsliff
- Soldier F at the Gravedigger Boy's House - Anthony Milner
- Judge - William Hoyland
- Usher - Gareth Hunt
- Old Sailor - Matthew Guinness
- Ben, a prison orderly - Matthew Carpenter
- Soldier H, guard in the prison - Geoffrey Hinsliff
- Soldier I, guard in the prison - Richard Howard
- Soldier J, Guard in the Prison - Bob Hoskins
- Old Prison Orderly - Anthony Douse
- Wounded Rebel Soldier - Matthew Guinness
- Bodice's Aide (Major Pellet) - Struan Rodger
- Soldier J, Convoy Escort - Bob Hoskins
- Soldier K - Convoy Escort - Geoffrey Hinsliff
- Soldier L, Convoy Escort - Richard Howard
- Prisoner 1 - Struan Rodger
- Prisoner 2 - Ron Pember
- Prisoner 3 - Derek Carpenter
- Prisoner 4, later Prison Doctor - William Hoyland
- Prison Commandant - Gareth Hunt
- Soldier M, Prison Guard - Ray Barron
- Soldier N, Prison Guard - Matthew Guinness
- Soldier O, Prison Guard - Eric Allen
- Farmer - Geoffrey Hinsliff
- Farmer's Wife - Marjorie Yates
- Farmer's Son - Anthony Milner
- Thomas - Alec Heggie
- John - Richard Howard
- Susan - Diana Quick
- Small Man - Ron Pember
- Officer - Gareth Hunt
- A Boy - Ray Barron
- And other soldiers, Workers, Strangers, Court Officials, Guards

Sets designed by John Napier
Costumes designed by Deirdre Clancy
Lighting by Andy Phillips

== Context ==
In the late 1970s, the British theatrical community was interested in the failure of the postwar socialist promise, and used historical drama to offer, in the words of Keith Peacock, "a clear reflection of the aspirations, activities, and worries of the Left during the 1970s". According to Louise Geddes, Bond's Lear is "often read as part of the renewed interest in the historical epic, and viewed as a nostalgic response to a troubled time."

== Critical reception ==
David L. Hirst wrote in his book Edward Bond, “it may be that the excessive amount of realistic violence in the play—far greater than in any of Bond’s previous dramas and never equaled in any play since—considerably alienated reviewers and public alike when the play was first performed". Conversely, Ronald Bryden of The New York Times reported in 1974 that Lear had by then become a "standard play in the European repertory" and garnered acclaim from critics, but that Royal Court audiences reacted unfavorably. Richard Scharine dubbed the events of the play "grotesque and difficult to believe." Charles Spencer wrote in The Daily Telegraph, "Unlike Shakespeare, Bond has a tendency to preach...his play lacks the richness and compassion of the Shakespeare original".

In 1973, Mel Gussow of The New York Times derided the ending as "sentimental and unaffecting", and argued that Lear "is so determinedly a thesis play, an intellectual exercise, that there is scant consideration for drama". Gussow stated that the play "lacks transitions and credibility. [...] Bond has allowed his philosophy to overcome his artistry." Walter Kerr compared it unfavorably to Saved (1965) in the same paper, and stated that the playwright "has here become so obsessed with the idea of violence that he has neglected to give it plausible, or even theatrically coherent, organization. [...] I do not necessarily quarrel with what he says [about violence in society]. The trouble with “Lear” is that he is saying it: his characters aren't, his narrative isn't. Everything is imposed by the author from the outset; the ' people' on stage can only do his bidding.mindlessly,’ without personality or so much as rationalized purpose."

However, Benedict Nightingale wrote, "The play’s horrors. . . have their perhaps overemphatic place in plot and theme: they also, you feel, reflect authentic pain and anger....Yet another horror, you say; but not one that quite eradicates the impression of human nobility, briefly and precariously achieved." A critic for The Observer dubbed it "one of the most powerful plays to have emerged in years...Although its tragic scale is unimaginable except in the theatre, it is not primarily a play for 'theatregoers', but is meant for anyone concerned with our apparently hell-bent course towards self-destruction." In Comparative Drama, Leslie Smith argued that "Bond sets up in his play a real, creative dialogue with the original, out of which comes a theatrical experience of impressive power, a Lear as seen by one of the most original and versatile dramatists of our time."

In 1987, Ray Loynd of Los Angeles Times wrote, "The play’s ending may not chasten you (as intended) but its bleak vision is not easily dismissed." Actor Paul Freeman stated in 1994, "Seeing Saved and Lear changed my life. They said something directly about my world - [Bond's] world too - of surburban London." In a 2001 article for The New York Times, Nightingale lauded the work as "grimly imaginative". Lyn Gardner of The Guardian awarded Jonathan Kent's 2005 production a full five stars, praising the "dazzling directness of Bond's writing" and stating that the production "restores Bond to his place as the greatest of post-war British playwrights."

Lynne Walker of The Independent wrote that "Bond's glittering and brittle dialogue is searing in its intensity." Dominic Cavendish argued in The Daily Telegraph that Kent "can't hide the monotonous rhythm of some of the writing, which often steamrollers characters into flattened mouthpieces, but the bleak, barbed comedy is all there". The critic also said that "after a while, we become inured to the grisly spectacle, and more and more aware of the moral force of Bond's writing." Charles Spencer lauded one sequence as an "improvement" on Shakespeare's original sequence due to a "revoltingly ingenious" addition. The Independent's Paul Taylor dubbed Lear a "mighty riposte to Shakespeare's tragedy".
