= Peter Stein (director) =

German theatre and opera director (born 1937)

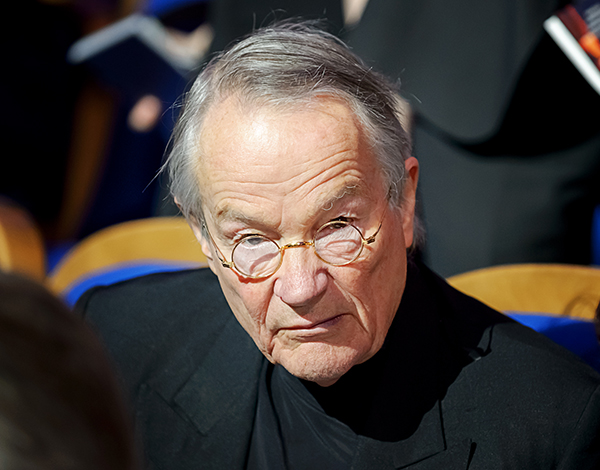
- Stein in 2015
- Born: 10 October 1937 (age 89); Berlin, Germany
- Occupations: Theatre director; opera director
- Spouse: Maddalena Crippa

Peter Stein (born 1 October 1937) is a German theatre and opera director who established himself at the Schaubühne am Lehniner Platz, a company that he brought to the forefront of German theatre.

== Biography ==
Born in Berlin, Stein grew up in an era defined by the Nazis. His father, Herbert Stein, was factory director of Alfred Teves, a motorcycle manufacturing firm that the Nazi regime employed to make automotive parts. Herbert was in charge of 250,000 forced laborers. He was also involved in the Confessing Church, a resistance group.

Stein has said that these events had a profound effect on his life. After the war, his father was sentenced to two years of forced labor for collaborating with the Nazis. Stein's academic performance nosedived and he barely made it into Frankfurt University. He then moved to Munich and enrolled at university there, pursuing a PhD thesis on the works of E. T. A. Hoffmann.

Having been curious about the theatre since his time in Frankfurt, he became a stagehand in Munich and eventually earned other parts. Proving himself, he was hired as director for Saved by Edward Bond. This piece threw him into the limelight and was critically acclaimed. Politically driven, Stein went on to direct many politically charged pieces, including Vietnam-Discourse by Peter Weiss, Bond's Early Morning, Seán O'Casey's Cock-a-Doodle Dandy, The Changeling by Thomas Middleton, and William Rowley and Goethe's Torquato Tasso.

The theatre where Stein originally worked in West Berlin was the Schaubühne am Halleschen Ufer. He joined it in 1970 and soon became its director, running it as an egalitarian socialist democracy. The success of his productions at the small theatre enabled him to move to a new space in 1981, which was built according to his wishes inside the Schaubühne am Lehniner Platz. After the end of his relationship with partner Jutta Lampe in 1985, Stein left the Schaubühne.

Stein has also directed operas, such as Rheingold in Paris, 1976 (conducted by Georg Solti); Otello for the Welsh National Opera in 1987; and Moses und Aron for the Salzburg Festival, 1996 (conducted by Pierre Boulez). In 2011, he directed a new production of Verdi's Macbeth for the Salzburg Festival, with Riccardo Muti conducting, and in 2013 he directed Verdi's Don Carlos in Salzburg. In 2019, Stein directed a production of Le Misanthrope with Lambert Wilson at the Le Comédia theatre in Paris.

He is married to Italian actress Maddalena Crippa.

== Europe Theatre Prize ==
In 2011, Stein was the recipient of the Europe Theatre Prize, in Saint Petersburg. The prize organization stated:

The award of the 14th Europe Theatre Prize to Peter Stein, the creator of monumental productions often staged in unusual spaces, celebrates the career of one of the most important figures of German and European theatre in the second half of the 20th century. Since the end of the 1960s, Peter Stein, leader and "demiurge" of an extraordinary collective, has succeeded in regenerating theatre in Germany and Germanic areas. He has enriched it with his interest in exploratory work on the actor and the scenic space, the text and timing, which – following a German and central European tradition – manifest in a provocative expression of politics, philology, collective artistic creation, revelations of history and a re-examination of the critical and social function of theatre in today's world. The experience of "his" collective, beginning in 1970 at the Schaubühne in Berlin with Bruno Ganz, Edith Clever, Jutta Lampe, Michael König and other actors, redefined the meaning of theatre work in terms that quite soon were recognisable as Steinian. Alternating reinterpretations of Ibsen, von Kleist, Brecht, Gorky, Shakespeare, Aeschylus and Chekhov with productions of Edward Bond, Peter Handke and Botho Strauss, the work evolved constantly, with a framework, method and choices through which Stein directed his actors and collaborators along a shared, highly engrossing path, at once artistic and political, that marked a particular period of the Berlin and European scene. Since then, Peter Stein has continued to take on an impressive range of material, from myth, classics, and opera to contemporary drama and film. His rigorous, relentless work, his determined explorations undaunted by geographic or linguistic barriers, continues to provide European theatre with reinterpretations and works of such remarkable intensity and meaning that we are forced to recognise theatre as an active, living body, with a distinct role in our era. Peter Stein's vitality, vast cultural knowledge and passion for every aspect of theatre work have driven him in recent years towards new creations and activities. He has staged a number of operas, particularly from the Russian repertoire, and in Russia presented a memorable adaptation of the Oresteia. He also has two recent publications: the well-received essay My Chekhov and Essayer encore, échouer toujours, a book in which he discusses his work in an interview with Georges Banu. For some years now, Stein has been living in Italy, following his marriage to actress Maddalena Crippa. There, among his other European and Italian activities, he has created and even personally handled the production aspects of a Faust Fantasia by Goethe and a theatrical reinterpretation of The Demons by Dostoyevsky, a play which was instantly acclaimed as the greatest theatrical event of recent times. Peter Stein's wide-ranging mastery and spirit of tireless exploration, as evidenced by these accomplishments, continue to offer new perspectives, teachings and inspiration to theatre around the world.

== Major productions ==
Productions without a specified location were at the Schaubühne Berlin.

- 1967 – Gerettet by Edward Bond (West German premiere), adapted by Martin Sperr, at the Werkraumtheater of the Munich Kammerspiele.

Kabale und Liebe by Friedrich Schiller at the Theater Bremen, with Michael König as Ferdinand, Edith Clever as Luise, Jutta Lampe as Lady Milford, Kurt Hübner as the president, and Bruno Ganz as Wurm.

- 1968 – In the Jungle of Cities by Bertolt Brecht at the Werkraumtheater of the Munich Kammerspiele, with Hans Korte as Shlink, Bruno Ganz as Garga, Edith Clever as Marie, and Dieter Laser as Wurm.

Vietnam-Discourse by Peter Weiss, co-directed with Wolfgang Schwiedrzik, at the Werkraumtheater of the Munich Kammerspiele, with Wolfgang Neuss as the Compère.

- 1969 – Torquato Tasso by Johann Wolfgang von Goethe

Early Morning by Edward Bond

- 1970 – The Changeling by Thomas Middleton and William Rowley

The Mother by Bertolt Brecht

- 1971 – Die Auseinandersetzung by Gerhard Kelling

Peer Gynt by Henrik Ibsen

- 1972 – Optimistic Tragedy by Vsevolod Vishnevsky

Fegefeuer in Ingolstadt by Marieluise Fleißer
Prinz Friedrich von Homburg by Heinrich von Kleist

- 1973 – The Piggy Bank (Das Sparschwein) by Eugène Labiche
- 1974 – Antikenprojekt I – 1. Abend: Übungen für Schauspieler

Die Unvernünftigen sterben aus by Peter Handke
Sommergäste by Maxim Gorky

- 1976 – Shakespeare's memory – 2 evenings
- 1977 – As You Like It by William Shakespeare
- 1978 – Trilogie des Wiedersehens by Botho Strauß

Big and Little (Groß und klein) by Botho Strauß, world premiere with Edith Clever as Lotte

- 1980 – Antikenprojekt II: Oresteia by Aeschylus
- 1981 – Klassenfeind by Nigel Williams, German premiere

Nicht Fisch nicht Fleisch by Franz Xaver Kroetz

- 1982 – Der Streit / Die Aufrichtigen by Pierre Carlet de Chamblain de Marivaux
- 1983 – Die Neger by Jean Genet
- 1984 – Drei Schwestern by Anton Chekhov

Der Park by Botho Strauß

- 1986 – The Hairy Ape (Der haarige Affe) by Eugene O'Neill

Phädra by Jean Racine

- 1989 – Der Kirschgarten by Anton Chekhov
- 1990 – Roberto Zucco by Bernard-Marie Koltès, world premiere. Reviews of the production at , , and
- 1992 – Julius Caesar by William Shakespeare

Pelléas et Mélisande by Debussy; Welsh National Opera 1992; conductor Pierre Boulez

- 1994 – Antony and Cleopatra by William Shakespeare
- 1998 – Hamlet by William Shakespeare
- 2000 – Faust I & II by Johann Wolfgang von Goethe

Simon Boccanegra by Giuseppe Verdi (at the Salzburg Easter Festival)

- 2003 – Die Möve by Anton Chekhov
- 2005 – Blackbird by David Harrower

Medea by Euripides

- 2006 – Troilus and Cressida (Shakespeare) and Mazeppa (Tchaikovsky/Burenin)
- 2007 – Electra by Sophocles
- 2010 – Oedipus at Colonus by Sophocles; Salzburg Festival; with Klaus Maria Brandauer as Oedipus
- 2011 – Macbeth by Verdi; Salzburg Festival; conductor Riccardo Muti
- 2010 – Don Carlos by Verdi; Salzburg Festival; conductor Antonio Pappano
- 2013 – Le prix Martin by Eugène Labiche, Odéon-Théâtre de l'Europe, Paris
