= Narrow Road to the Deep North =

Play written by Edward Bond

- Written by: Edward Bond
- Original language: English
- Setting: Japan about the seventeenth, eighteenth or nineteenth centuries

Premiere
- Date premiered: 24 June 1968
- Place premiered: Belgrade Theatre, Coventry

Narrow Road to the Deep North is a 1968 satirical play on the British Empire by the English playwright Edward Bond.

It is a political parable set in Japan in the Edo period. It deals with the poet Basho and the changing political landscape over about 35 years.

The play won Bond the John Whiting Award for 1968.

== Quotation ==
Of course, that's only a symbol, but we need symbols to protect us from ourselves.

== The censor ==
Because of the play's scenes of violence (it was known in the press as "The One With Five Dead Babies and a Disembowelling"), it was originally refused a theatrical license by the Lord Chamberlain, though permission was eventually given after Bond agreed to some last minute amendments.

== Original production ==
It was first performed in 1968 for the Peoples and Cities conference at the Belgrade Theatre, Coventry, in a production directed by Jane Howell:

- Basho, old, a priest - Peter Needham
- Kiro, twenty - Paul Howes
- Argi - Malcolm Ingram
- Tola - Christopher Matthews
- Heigoo - John Rowe
- Breebree - Gordon Reid
- Shogo, twenty-five - Edward Peel
- Prime Minister - Peter Sproule
- Commodore, forty-seven - Nigel Hawthorne
- Georgina, thirty-nine - Susan Williamson
- Peasants, soldiers, tars, tribesmen, etc. -
- Alison King
- Diana Berriman
- Alan David
- Geoffrey White
- Vandra Edwards
- Malcolm Ingram
- Christopher Matthews
- John Rowe
- Gordon Reid
- Peter Sproule

== Royal Court Theatre ==
The play was then staged as part of an Edward Bond season at the Royal Court in 1969, to mark the abolition of stage censorship the previous year.

== Critical reception ==
Bond said he "knew the critics would like it, and they did." The Independent's Maeve Walsh reported that Narrow Road to the Deep North was found by the critics to be cryptic but was still admired overall. The Observer called it "a funny, ironic and beautiful play...In a series of short elegant scenelets, Brechtian in style, but with a sly mock-Zen lightness all their own, the play compares, and finally equates, the tyranny of brute force and religious conscience." Clive Barnes of The New York Times, despite praising earlier productions, criticized the Vivian Beaumont Theater performance as "distressingly tedious" for the acting and staging. Barnes wrote, "The writing has a fake Oriental archness to it—a solemnity, at times a pomposity. Yet the ideas are fresh. [...] Narrow Road to the Deep North is far better play than it would appear to be from its Lincoln Center production. But on just how much better I will for the moment hold my peace."

Ann Marie Demling noted that it is one of the Bond plays to which "awards and citations of excellence have been given" along with Saved (1965), Lear (1971), Bingo (1973) and The Fool (1975). Richard Stayton of Los Angeles Times wrote that "Bond’s metaphor for the Vietnam War unfortunately travels neatly into the 1990s as a mirror to such tragedies as Bosnia", but panned the performance he had seen (which was by The Actors' Gang). Gerry Colgan of The Irish Times wrote in 2001 that while Bond's works were not generally well-known in Ireland, Narrow Road to the Deep North was a play that had "[resonated] down the years" along with Saved (1965). Michael Mangan described it as one of Bond's "major plays" in a 2018 book on the dramatist. Academic Amer Hamed Suliman dubbed it "one of Edward Bond's most significant works" in 2019.
