= Early Morning =

- First edition: Calder and Boyars, 1968
- Original language: English
- Written by: Edward Bond

Premiere
- Date: 31 March 1968
- Place: Royal Court Theatre, London

Early Morning is a surrealist farce by the English dramatist Edward Bond. It was first produced in 1968, opening on 31 March at the Royal Court Theatre, directed by William Gaskill. The play takes place in a contorted version of the court of Queen Victoria who is portrayed as a lesbian. Her two sons are made conjoined twins. This made the play extremely scandalous, as did a scene in which the character Len eats another person standing in a queue in front of him. Like Bond's earlier play Saved (1965), it was initially condemned but later came to be viewed positively.

== The censor ==
Early Morning was the final play to be banned by the Lord Chamberlain's Office when it was refused a license in its entirety in November 1967. The Royal Court then formed a members-only club to stage the play (as they had with Bond's Saved), but their plans were thwarted with the arrival of police at the 1968 first night. A further performance was given under guise of a free dress rehearsal in April. However, in September, stage censorship was abolished altogether with the passing of the Theatres Act 1968. The English Stage Company subsequently staged an ‘Edward Bond season’ at the Royal Court in 1969, with Saved, Narrow Road to the Deep North and Early Morning, followed by a European tour of the plays.

== Original cast ==
- Albert - Nigel Hawthorne
- Disraeli - Malcolm Tierney
- Arthur - Peter Eyre
- George - Tom Chadbon
- Lord Chamberlain - David Anderson
- Lord Mennings - Norman Eshley
- Queen Victoria - Moira Redmond
- Florence Nightingale - Marianne Faithfull
- Len - Dennis Waterman
- Joyce - Jane Howell
- Jones - Hugh Armstrong
- Griss - Harry Meacher
- Doctor - Gavin Reid
- Gladstone - Jack Shepherd
- Ned - Bruce Robinson
- Julian - We May Never Know

== Critical reception ==
Maeve Walsh in The Independent argues that reviews for the second (post-censorship) performance of Early Morning were negative, noting that amongst contemporary reviews, the Daily Mirror accused the play of "Making an art form of the revolting"; City Press called it "The most disturbing and grotesque piece I have ever seen"; and The People concluded, "Ugh". Herbert Kretzmer remarked that the three plays staged in 1969 (Saved, Early Morning and Narrow Road to the Deep North) served as "a reminder that it is possible to become famous for having achieved nothing much at all."

However, Kathleen Riley wrote in Nigel Hawthorne on Stage (2005) that reception after the second performance was "considerably warmer". Ronald Bryden of The New York Times also reported in 1974 that after the 1969 revival of three Bond plays including Early Morning, "the consensus was that a formidable talent had been savagely misjudged." Martin Esslin described it as a "strange, significant, and important play". T. J. Groser called Early Morning a difficult but "important" play in a 1970 review of a University of Otago performance. In a 1980 article, academic Frances Rademacher listed it among Bond's major plays. Niloufer Harben asserted in 1988 that "it is an extraordinary achievement. Revolutionary in approach and intention, it opens up new possibilities for the treatment of history.”

Jenny S. Spencer wrote in a 1992 book on Bond that the play is "richly textured" and "incorporates the working-class wit of Saved". Jana J. Monji of Los Angeles Times praised the play as "delightfully nasty" and very "intellectually satisfying".

== Sources ==
- Banham, Martin, ed. 1998. The Cambridge Guide to Theatre. Cambridge: Cambridge UP. ISBN 0-521-43437-8.
