= Olly's Prison =

1993 play by Edward Bond

- Written by: Edward Bond
- Original language: English

Premiere
- Date premiered: 1 May 1993

Olly's Prison is a 1993 play by English dramatist Edward Bond. In it, a man who has killed his daughter and forgotten his crime tries to find meaning in his life. The work divided critics.

== Reception ==
Gary Lawrence of Bucks Free Press billed Olly's Prison as "long, baffling, and ultimately annoying". Tony Coult argued that "why it's so profoundly political - and so brilliant and disturbing - is that he paints a portrait of an everyday, small 'F' fascist and he finds the fascist in everybody. [...] In some respects it embodies a kind of cliche about who is really in prison, who is really free. It ceases to be a cliche because it's worked through with such thoroughness and truth." The Independent's W. Stephen Gilbert called the work "dense and concentrated. At a glance, it can be daunting: easy enough to characterise it so. [...] To go with the play, though, is to be gripped in a painful but enlightening experience." Frank Rizzo of Variety wrote of the play, "Bond is still exploring violence disguised by domesticity and medicated by social norms. And he is still doing it in ways that leave audiences stunned. Call it shock therapy for the theatrically blase."

The Guardian's Michael Billington stated that the work "shows the weaknesses as well as the strengths of late Bond", praising the "cryptic vigour of Bond's language" but also arguing that what the work "doesn't admit, in contrast to an early masterpiece like Saved, is the possibility of change." Ed Siegel of Boston.com said that "his theatrics are much less predictable [than his writing about theater], and despite the trappings of working-class drama, he keeps an audience very much on its toes." But Siegel also argued, "Shock gives way to anti-authoritarian symbolism that is obvious and clumsy. [...] The fight that erupts toward the end of the play goes on way too long. Worse, it seems inspired by Bond's worldview rather than by the flow of the play, particularly since it involves the least interesting characters onstage." In World Literature Today, Stephen Grecco wrote that Olly's Prison is "not nearly as dramatically effective" as Saved, criticizing the narrative as improbable. He also deemed Bond's view of society and human behavior "narrow and somewhat paternalistic".
