= The GIs of Comedy =

Standup comedy troupe

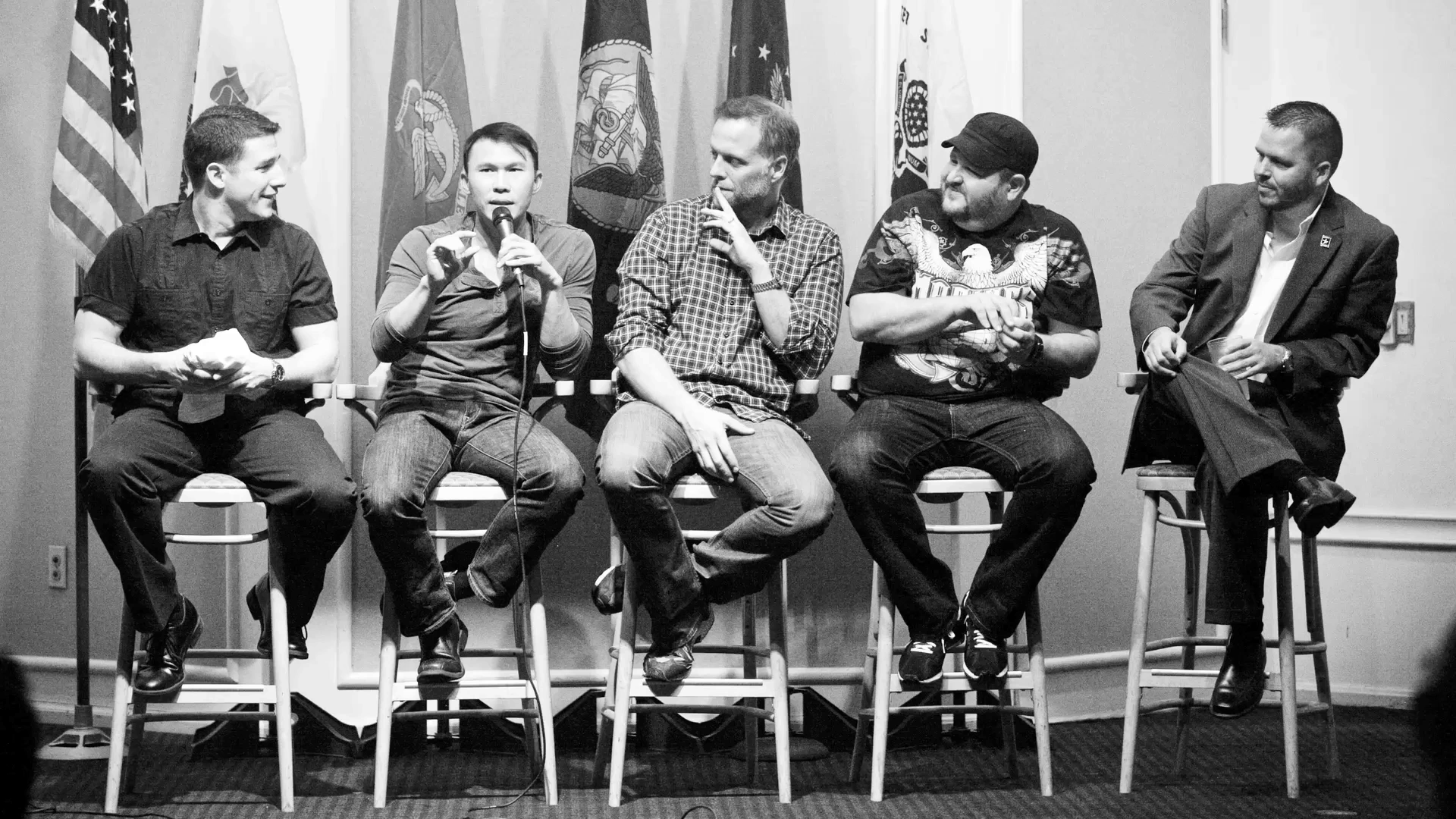
Jose Sarduy, Thom Tran, Tom Irwin, and two other members of The GIs of Comedy Tour

The GI's of Comedy is a standup comedy troupe featuring comedians Thom Tran, Tom Irwin, and Jose Sarduy, who are all veterans of the United States military. Tran served in the United States Army from 1997 to 2005, Tom Irwin served in the United States Army from 1986 to 1988, and Jose Sarduy continues to serve as a Lieutenant Colonel in the United States Air Force Reserve with 28 years of service. The group has toured together since 2010 with their first show at the Ventura Harbor Comedy Club in Southern California and then across the country. The most recent performance was a 2-hour show when the group filmed their unbroadcast TV special.

== Origin Story ==
Thom Tran who was already a standup comedian, created the group in 2010 after moving to Los Angeles, California. After performing at a show to benefit the Bob Hope USO at LAX hosted by Los Angeles radio station KETH 101 and the Long Beach Laugh Factory, Tran recruited several other comedians with ties to the military to form the group. Tran met US Air Force veteran, comic Jose Sarduy, who at the time had only been in Los Angeles for 6-months, while Sarduy was performing at the Jon Lovitz Comedy Club at Universal City in Los Angeles, CA. Tran then met fellow Army veteran Tom Irwin at a second benefit for the Bob Hope USO, also at the Long Beach Laugh Factory.

== Mottos ==
The motto of the group is "Standup Comics. All Veterans. Still Serving. One Joke At A Time." The motto was established by Tran, who created the tour. The motto is meant to summarize the group's goal of continuing to serve their fellow service members with their comedy. In 2012, Tran established a second motto, "A Comedic Troupe of Troops", being a play on the spelling and meaning of the words "troupe" and "troop".

== Performances ==
After several preliminary shows in Southern California at the Jon Lovitz Comedy Club and the Hollywood Improv, the GIs of Comedy began to tour throughout the continental United States in 2011, including performances at the Comedy Stop in Atlantic City, New Jersey and several stops in Texas. In 2012 Army Entertainment contracted the group to tour with comedians Josh Blue (winner of NBC's Last Comic Standing) and another Army veteran turned comedian, Jody Fuller for the "LOL Tour" which made stops at Ft. Knox, Kentucky; Ft. Campbell, Kentucky; White Sands Missile Range, New Mexico; Ft. Huachuca, Arizona; Ft. Hunter Liggett, California; Carlisle Barracks, Pennsylvania; Ft. George G. Meade, Maryland, Aberdeen Proving Grounds, Maryland; Joint Base Lewis-McChord, Washington; Ft. Leonard Wood, Missouri; and Ft. Riley, Kansas.

In 2013, the group continued to tour sporadically because of individual career schedules including a second 2-day performance at Ft. Knox, Kentucky; an abbreviated performance at the Army Ball in Long Beach, California; a benefit performance for the Non-Commissioned Officers Association Convention in Las Vegas, Nevada; and a series of quarterly performance at the Comix at Foxwoods Comedy Club in Connecticut, but with the main focus of the year being to film their broadcast television special on November 2, 2013, in Buffalo, New York.

In 2017, the group was featured on the television show Hiring America.

== Live special ==
On November 2, 2013, the GI's of Comedy filmed a 2-hour live special to be edited for broadcast and a special edition DVD. The show was filmed at Buffalo State College's Rockwell Hall Performing Arts Center in Buffalo, NY. The show was executive produced by Thom Tran and his 69 Echo Production Company and Rodman Schley and his 8-Ball Studios from Denver, CO. The footage is in post-production. No scheduled air date or network has been set. The GI's of Comedy have been featured stories by the Associated Press (2011) on the CBS Early Show (2011), Fox News (2011), Soldier Magazine: the Official Magazine of the US Army (2012) and guest starred on the Lifetime Television series Coming Home (2012).

== Sources ==
- Sokol, Jenny (November 8, 2013). "Sokol: Veterans trade weapons for punch lines". The Orange County Register.
- Collins, Elizabeth M. (November 21, 2012). "Still serving, one joke at a time". Soldiers Magazine.
- Rogers, John (August 11, 2011). "G.I.s of Comedy serving America 1 joke at a time". Yahoo News. Associated Press.
- "The GIs of Comedy on Eyewitness News This Morning". WKBW-TV. August 1, 2013.
- Whitaker, Tracy (March 15, 2013). "The GIs of Comedy returning to Fort Knox". Fort Knox Gold Standard.
- DeNeve, Brett (October 25, 2013). "The GIs of Comedy Come to Buff State, Bearing Both Gifts of Laughter and Opportunity". Buffalo Rising.
- Donelan, Charles (September 11, 2013). "GIs of Comedy Bring Big Laughs". The Santa Barbara Independent.
