= Jane Howell =

- Born: 15 Aug 1935; London, United Kingdom
- Known for: Theatre and Television

Jane Howell (15 Aug 1935) is an English theatre and television director. She is known for directing six television plays of the BBC Television Shakespeare series in the 1980s: The Winter's Tale (1981), Henry VI, Part 1 (1983), Henry VI, Part 2 (1983), Henry VI, Part 3 (1983), Richard III (1983), and Titus Andronicus (1985).

== Biography ==
Howell was born in London but spent her early years in Somerset, living with her mother and paternal grandparents in a hamlet in the Mendips. Her father was a London policeman and the family lived in Wandsworth, London, after the war. Howell attended Bristol University and the Bristol Old Vic Theatre School.

== Career ==
Howell directed plays with the Hornchurch Repertory Company in the early 1960s, then joined the English Stage Company at the Royal Court Theatre. She was artistic director of the Northcott Theatre at Exeter University from 1971 to 1974, where she directed the world premiere of Edward Bond's Bingo in 1973, starring Bob Peck. Subsequently, Howell and John Dove directed the London premiere of Bingo at the Royal Court Theatre; the cast included John Gielgud, Arthur Lowe, Ewan Hooper, Oliver Cotton, and Paul Jesson. At the Royal Court Theatre, Howell initiated a Schools Scheme in 1966, which evolved into the Young Peoples' Theatre. Among her other work, she directed Edward Bond's Narrow Road to the Deep North in 1968 at the Belgrade Theatre, Coventry, David Mercer's Cousin Vladimir, in 1978 at the Aldwych Theatre, London for the Royal Shakespeare Company, and a 1989 production of Shakespeare's Coriolanus for the Young Vic Theatre, London. In 1983, She directed Kevin Kline in Richard III for Joseph Papp's Shakespeare in the Park at the Delacorte Theater in Central Park.

In the 1970s, Howell took the BBC directors training course and began her television career. Among her many television credits are episodes of Gems (1988) and Class Act (1994). Mini-series she directed include Drums Along Balmoral Drive (1986), Amongst Barbarians (1990) -- both for the series Screenplay—and Into the Fire (1996). Her television plays of the Henry VI-Richard III tetralogy for the BBC Shakespeare Series are among the mostly highly regarded productions of that series. Howell was the only female director of the series.
