= Bryanston (disambiguation) =

Bryanston is the name of several places around the world:

- Bryanston, Dorset, England
- Bryanston School, Dorset, England
- Bryanston, Gauteng, part of Sandton, South Africa
  - Bryanston (House of Assembly of South Africa constituency)
- Bryanston, Ontario, Canada, a hamlet within Middlesex Centre

Bryanston is also an English surname. People with the surname include:

- Claudette Bryanston, English theatre director

== Films ==
- Bryanston Films (UK)
- Bryanston Films
