= Restoration (play) =

- Original language: English
- Written by: Edward Bond
- Subject: Class conflict

Premiere
- Date: 22 July 1981

Restoration is a 1981 play by English dramatist Edward Bond that has been described as "simultaneously a Restoration comedy, a parody of Restoration comedies, and a dissection of class privilege in the Restoration era." It premiered at the Royal Court Theatre on 22 July 1981 with the master, his wife (Old Lady Are), his servant Bob, and Bob's wife played by Simon Callow, Irene Handl, Philip Davis, and Debby Bishop, respectively.

== Reception ==
Ian Stuart reports that both critics and audiences initially had a lukewarm view of Restoration. Mel Gussow of The New York Times stated in 1981 that it "is overly voluble and attenuated, but [...] filled with astute observations on aristocratic malfeasance as well compromise and cowardice on the part of the lower classes." He said in 1986 that while the text is didactic, Restoration "is, at its core, an abrasive indictment of a society eager to set its own house on fire." University of Washington professor Stephen Weeks, who saw the play in 1992 at Oregon Shakespeare Festival, lauded Restoration as "easily the wittiest of Bond's intertextual adventures [...] Lord Are is a masterly comic creation by any standard". He said that while the unity of working classes against capital was not believable by the 1990s, "what cannot be gainsaid is the brilliance of Bond's language and dramaturgy".

The Guardian's Lyn Gardner dubbed Restoration "a play that rings with wild laughter, and chills you to the bone" despite being "slow to catch fire". Dominic Cavendish said it gets "sharper and sharper, at once funnier and nastier, as the evening progresses." In 2002, Christopher Innes dubbed Restoration the "only play to rise above this simplification in the recent phase of Bond's career" in which protagonists lack complexity and are either virtuous or evil. Four years later, Mark Ravenhill argued that the play "contains some of Bond's most brilliant writing and perhaps his most memorable character, the monstrous Lord Are [...] Bond's sympathies clearly lie with the servant classes. But he invests the aristocratic characters with such savage comic invention that they are horribly, hilariously watchable."

While Bond is best known for his plays in the 1960s and 1970s, Peter Billingham in 2007 referred to Restoration as one of his major late works (along with the War trilogy, Coffee, and Born). It was listed as a career highlight by The Guardian in 2008, and as one of the playwright's "acutest attacks on the British class system". In 2011, Judith Newmark of St. Louis Post-Dispatch billed the play as a “probing satire [...] with sharp swerves of mood [...] ‘Restoration’ makes for keen political theater, not a billboard for a worthy cause but an exploration of big, demanding themes.”

Conversely, University of Oxford professor David Womersley said that Bond "fails to "[make] his victims engaging". He criticized the song "Mans Groans", stating that the play has "too much of this kind of banal preaching". The Spectator's Mark Amory praised the performances of Davis and Bishop but wrote, "Some of the words of the songs are simple and strong [...] the music is pretty, and the idea of the actors stepping out of character to express themselves directly to the audience sounds effective. In the event I found it tedious." A reviewer in Evening Standard said that "Bond brilliantly pastiches the quipstrewn badinage of the genre"; however, the reviewer also argued, "The songs make tedious a second half that already springs few surprises. [...] Bond, having impaled his satirical target, seems to stand around, his sword still embedded, wondering what else to do."
