= The Chair Plays =

Trilogy of plays by Edward Bond

- Original language: English
- Written by: Edward Bond
- Subject: Totalitarianism

Premiere
- Date: November 2, 2000 (Have I None); October 2005 (The Under Room); July 2006 (Chair)

The Chair Plays are a trilogy of plays by English dramatist Edward Bond. The trilogy includes Have I None, The Under Room, and Chair. Have I None was premiered by Big Brum on 2 November 2000 at Birmingham's Castle Vale Artsite. The Under Room was also premiered by Big Brum at MAC in October 2005. Chair was written specially for radio, and while it was written in 2000, its first staged production was in Lisbon, at the Teatro da Cornucópia in June 2005. The London premiere of the entire trilogy was at Lyric Hammersmith, on 19 April 2012. Have I None and Chair received mostly positive reviews, but The Under Room polarized critics.

== Reception ==
=== Have I None/The Under Room ===
Kieron Quirke described the 2002 Southwark Playhouse performance of Have I None as a "must-see". Michael Billington gave the same production three stars out of five, arguing that "while Bond's cryptic parable has a certain grisly power, it never plausibly explains how we get there from here." He praised the gallows humor but said of the state's methods, "It makes little sense, for instance, to [outlaw family ties], since [the nuclear family] has traditionally been the state's great instrument of power."

The Guardian's Lyn Gardner gave the 2005 MAC production of The Under Room four out of five stars and praised the play as "an intricate puzzle that is compelling in both its intellectual and emotional intensity. [...] a reminder that while British theatre may have deserted him, his powers never have." Reviewing the 2012 Lyric Hammersmith production by Bond, however, she argued that "Bond the director well and truly scuppers Bond the playwright [...] It is a play of slowly dawning consciousness, but the ponderous production, which weighs almost every word and action with the same significance, sinks the drama". Mark Ravenhill wrote in 2010 that The Under Room "is as good as anything as Bond has ever written. By the end of the performance I was shaken and tearful, not only because the play had asked such troubling questions about the way we live our lives, but because of an overwhelming sadness that such a significant play can be so marginalised."

Reviewing the production of the two plays at the Lyric Hammersmith, Matt Trueman praised the decision of Sean Holmes to play against the "plainness" of Have I None. However, he criticized Bond for giving the text of The Under Room (which he directed) "such reverence that 33 pages stretch to 105 minutes. Everything exists on the stage precisely as it does on the page. The result is a constant portentousness, rather than the itchy, spluttered urgency that makes Have I None crackle." In 2012, Carmel Doohan of Exeunt argued of Have I None, "There is a sense of repetition in the couple’s arguments that is clearly meant to develop into a refrain, but instead of subtext, the words resonate with nothing but their own meaninglessness. [...] The play creates a sense of ailenation [sic] but one with little social or political context." The critic also said of The Under Room that "the ideas never fully translate into the drama itself. [...] the play fails to fully engage with the issues it touches upon."

Additionally, a reviewer in Evening Standard dismissed the Lyric Hammersmith performance of the two plays as "a long evening of hard grind for precious little reward". He described Have I None as "Goldilocks and the Three Bears as directed by Stanley Kubrick" and much better than The Under Room (which the reviewer criticized as causing "confusion [and] tedium").

New Haven Review's Donald Brown called Have I None an "entertaining play" in 2014 and argued, "The strength of the play is in its pacing, letting things settle upon us during lulls, broken-up at any time by shouting fits."

=== Chair ===
Reviewing the 2012 Lyric Hammersmith performance, Daniel B. Yates of Exeunt argued that Chair "begins life in relative stoic tedium before becoming a subtle version of a late Pinter play as it mounts its case to be a harrowing, ugly in its clarity, sternum-crushing affair". In Variety, Marilyn Stasio praised Bond as adding some highly memorable images to the theatrical repertoire, calling the play "harrowing [...] Let other playwrights shriek about the state of the world. Bond does it in his own, far deadlier fashion." Andy Propst argued that Chair "begins with simple mysteriousness and rapidly accelerates to levels of truly thrilling tautness and disconcerting brutality."

The Guardian's Michael Billington said the work "is compulsively watchable – until, that is, the last 10 minutes, when Bond illustrates his arguments with needless explicitness." But Billington praised it as "a strangely hypnotic play that proves a chair is as potent a visual symbol for Bond as it was for Vincent van Gogh." A reviewer in Time Out gave Chair four out of five stars and said it "features some of his best satirical writing".

Other reviewers were less favorable. Sarah Hemming of Financial Times argued, "There is the odd moment of black humour and the piece has a certain bleak poetry. Bond creates some memorable images". However, Hemming said Bond's production "is slow, rather flat and doesn’t draw out the tension and terror in the writing." In The New York Times, Charles Isherwood derided the play as both "weightless and ponderous [...] the ideas behind it feel generic, and the situations never quite ring true. The cryptic, often incomprehensible behavior of even the most sympathetic characters keeps us from being either disturbed or engaged."
