= The War Plays =

- Front cover of a 1998 release containing the trilogy
- Original language: English
- Written by: Edward Bond
- Subject: Nuclear war

Premiere
- Date: 29 May 1985 (Red Black and Ignorant); 29 May 1985 (The Tin Can People); 17 July 1985 (Great Peace); 25 July 1985 (Trilogy)

The War Plays (sometimes referred to as The War Trilogy) is the name often given to a trilogy of plays by English dramatist Edward Bond: Red Black and Ignorant, The Tin Can People, and Great Peace.

== Reception ==
Max Stafford-Clark has written that with the Barbican production of The War Plays, Bond "reduced a talented cast into a stumbling and incoherent shambles of walking wounded. Edward Bond is simply the most difficult person I have worked with in 40 years." In 1996, author Janelle G. Reinelt described the English reception as "chilly". Author Michael Mangan commented that the 1995 Odéon-Théâtre de l'Europe performance was quite successful, however, and that in France the work "was described as the most important play written since the Second World War."

While Bond is best known for his plays in the 1960s and 1970s, Peter Billingham in 2007 referred to The War Trilogy as one of his major late works (along with Restoration, Coffee, and Born). They were collectively listed by Michael Billington as one of the five greatest works of dystopian drama. He dubbed them "[d]isquieting, dystopian and too important to be ignored." In a 2018 thesis, Chien-Cheng Chen listed the trilogy as a highlight among the contemporary British dramas he had read, and lauded "its versatile use of dramatic forms and its profound exploration of modern human conditions."

In The Performance of Power (1991), Reinelt compared the trilogy favorably with other works of contemporary British theatre that contain utopian elements, saying that "the combination of socialist and feminist issues raised in [...] The War Plays best approaches the imaginative task of conceiving and embodying an alternative reality. [...] [the plays] address important issues concerning the socialization of family roles. They deconstruct the notion of 'natural' mother, with its associations of an instinctual bond between mother and child based on birthing, and replace it with a notion of community nurturing".

Conversely, Keith Colquhoun called the plays "particularly unremitting in tone". In a 2010 thesis, Frank A. Torma criticized “Bond’s attempt in his epic works, like The War Plays and Human Cannon, to give the characters poetry to say in direct address to the audience. Bond’s poetic voice is not exceptional and the result of its insertion in his plays negatively postpones the dramatic flow.” After seeing a 2010 performance of Red Black and Ignorant directed by Maja Milatovic-Ovadia, Ian Shuttleworth of Financial Times wrote, "Bond shows his skill at flinty poetry, but also includes some crass agitprop, and even when his writing feels prophetic it seems like the prophecy of a Cassandra, encouraging repudiation rather than consideration."
