= Jonathan Kent (director) =

English theatre director (born 1946)

- Born: 1 January 1949 (age 77); South Africa
- Citizenship: South Africa
- Occupations: Theatrical director, Director, Actor

Jonathan Kent CBE (born 1949) is an English theatre director and opera director. He is known as a director/producer alongside Ian McDiarmid at the Almeida Theatre from 1990 to 2002.

He was appointed Commander of the Order of the British Empire (CBE) by Queen Elizabeth II in February 2016 for his services to the performing arts.

== Early life ==
Kent was born in England to architect parents. They moved to Cape Town, South Africa, when Kent was one year old. He went to school at Diocesan College, Rondebosch, where he appeared as King Lear in the school play in 1964. He originally thought of taking up the profession of painter, but returned to England to study acting at the Central School of Speech and Drama in the 1970s. After completing his drama education, he joined the repertory company Glasgow Citizens Theatre in Scotland.

== Career ==
=== Stage director ===
By 1990 Kent had formed an association with the Scottish actor Ian McDiarmid, and between 1990 and 2002 as joint artistic directors, they turned the Almeida into a major producing theatre. The success of this venture—presenting a wide range of international plays—led to 14 plays produced under Kent's tenure being transferred to the West End and also to Broadway. His productions for the Almeida included When We Dead Awaken; All for Love; Medea (also West End/Broadway); Chatsky; The Showman; The School for Wives; Gangster No 1; Tartuffe; The Life of Galileo; The Rules of the Game; Ivanov (also in Moscow); The Government Inspector; Naked (also West End); The Tempest; Hamlet (also Broadway); Richard II; Coriolanus (also New York/Tokyo); Phèdre; Britannicus (also West End/New York); Plenty(West End); Lulu (also Washington); Platonov and King Lear.

Other theatre work includes Le Cid, Mother Courage and Her Children, The False Servant, Oedipus and The Emperor and Galilean (National Theatre); Man of La Mancha (Broadway); Hamlet (Japan); Hecuba (Donmar); Bond's Lear (Sheffield Crucible); As You Desire Me (West End); Faith Healer (Dublin/Broadway); A Month in the Country (Chichester Festival Theatre); Sweeney Todd (Chichester Festival Theatre and the West End), Private Lives (Chichester Festival Theatre and the West End), Good People (The Hampstead Theatre and the West End) and Gypsy (Chichester Festival Theatre and the West End).

In 2007 Kent was invited to become the artistic director of the Haymarket Theatre for one year, as a means of re-invigorating the West End theatre scene. He directed three plays: William Wycherley's The Country Wife, Edward Bond's The Sea, and Marguerite, a musical based on La Dame aux Camélias, with music by Michel Legrand and book by Alain Boublil.

He directed the Roundabout Theatre Company's Broadway production of Eugene O'Neill's Long Day's Journey into Night with Jessica Lange at the American Airlines Theatre in 2016. The production won two 2016 Tony Awards, including Best Performance by an Actress in a Leading Role in a Play.

His acclaimed Chichester Festival Theatre productions of Platonov, Ivanov and The Seagull by Anton Chekhov - in a new version by David Hare - played at the National Theatre, London, in 2016.

=== Opera director ===
Following his departure from the Almeida, Kent started directing operas. His operatic directing debut was during the Santa Fe Opera's 2003 season production of Katya Kabanova, a production received with great acclaim, as noted by Simon Williams in Opera News: "Director Jonathan Kent is new to opera, having made his name in spoken drama in London. He displayed a natural feel for the dynamics and rhetoric of opera, and he directed with unwavering attention to the score. In short, this was an outstanding interpretation of a great modern tragedy".

His first British production was Michael Tippett's oratorio, A Child of Our Time in 2005. He returned that same year to Santa Fe for Mozart's Lucio Silla and again in 2006, when he directed the US premiere of Thomas Adès' The Tempest, which received significant critical acclaim. London's The Sunday Times critic, Hugh Canning wrote:

Kent's production began with one of the most magical stage images I can recall in recent opera seasons. Paul Brown's permanent set is a sandy island with a pool of water representing the sea: in the prelude, a procession of fully clothed people (presumably the Neapolitan shipwreck survivors) walk out of the water like amphibious creatures, a dazzlingly surreal opening gambit in a production remarkable for its narrative clarity and observant delineation of character. Kent and Brown achieve an organic fusion of theatrical elements with the simplest of means. The dune-like 'island' provides opportunities for wittily surprising entrances – at one point, Ariel's head pops out of Prospero's magic cabinet – and perilous exits – the comic characters, Stefano and Trinculo, are swallowed up as if by quicksand.

In Britain in 2006, Kent directed a new production of Puccini's Tosca for The Royal Opera, Covent Garden. Expectations were high, since this was Covent Garden's replacement for the famous Franco Zeffirelli production for Maria Callas in 1964, and which had been in use for 42 years. Kent "believes Tosca, which Puccini adapted from a five-act French play, is an ideal vehicle for his talents:

What I admire about it, quite apart from the thrilling music, is its theatre craft ... It's a taut, sinewy melodrama, exquisitely put together. There isn't an ounce of flesh on it ... That's what interested me: to find a way within that hurtling narrative to examine the relationships and its themes of sex, power and death.

In 2007 Kent directed Richard Strauss' Elektra at the Mariinsky Theatre in Saint Petersburg and Benjamin Britten's The Turn of the Screw for the Glyndebourne Festival Opera in its 2007 season. He returned to Glyndebourne in 2009 to direct a new production of The Fairy-Queen with subsequent presentations in Caen, Paris and New York and Don Giovanni for the Festival and in 2012. His most recent production for Glyndebourne of Hippolyte et Aricie saw him reunited with William Christie following their successful collaboration with The Fairy-Queen internationally.

He returned to the Santa Fe Opera in June 2008 to direct a new production of The Marriage of Figaro and again in 2009 when he directed the premiere of a new opera by Paul Moravec and Terry Teachout, The Letter based on Somerset Maugham's 1927 stage version of his short story of the same name.

Kent made his debut at the English National Opera with Richard Wagner's The Flying Dutchman in 2012 before taking it to the Royal Danish Theatre, Copenhagen, the following year.

His production for the Royal Opera House in Covent Garden, Manon Lescaut, transferred to the Shanghai Opera House in 2013.
