= The Fool (play) =

- Paperback first edition: Methuen, 1976
- Original language: English
- Written by: Edward Bond

Premiere
- Date: 18 November 1975
- Place: Royal Court Theatre, London

The Fool: Scenes of Bread and Love is a play by the English playwright Edward Bond. It traces the life of the poet John Clare against the backdrop of the Industrial Revolution, from his roots in rural East Anglia via literary success in London to his final years in a lunatic asylum. The play was first performed at the Royal Court Theatre in 1975, in a production directed by Peter Gill and featuring a cast including Tom Courtenay, David Troughton and Nigel Terry among others.

After a 35-year hiatus, The Fool was revived in the UK in late 2010 as part of the six-play Edward Bond Season at the Cock Tavern Theatre in Kilburn, London. Bond himself directed the production, with Ben Crispin playing the role of John Clare. It is one of the highly regarded works in Bond's output.

== Original cast ==
- John Clare - Tom Courtenay
- Miles - David Troughton
- Darkie - Nigel Terry
- Lawrence - Mick Ford
- Patty - Bridget Turner
- Mary - Caroline Hutchison
- Lord Milton - Nicholas Selby
- The Parson - John Normington
- Lord Milton's Guests - Peter Myers,
  John Boswall,
  Malcolm Ingram,
  Robert Lloyd,
  Shiela Kelley,
  Avril Marsh
- Wadlow, Lord Milton's Gamekeeper - Roger Hume
- Hilary, the Assistant Keeper - David Ellison
- Bob - Roderick Smith
- Peter - Malcolm Ingram
- Betty - Shiela Kelley
- Hamo - Brian Hall
- Gentlemen - Peter Myers, Robert Lloyd, John Boswall
- Hicks, a Warder - Tony Rohr
- Governor - Peter Myers
- Porter - Ken Gajadhar
- Jackson - Brian Hall
- Porter's Backers - Malcolm Ingram, Mick Ford
- Jackson's Backers - David Troughton, Roger Hume
- Referee - David Ellison
- A Boy - Roderick Smith
- Mrs. Emmerson - Isabel Dean
- Charles Lamb - Robert Lloyd
- Mary Lamb - Gillian Martell
- Admiral Lord Radstock - Bill Fraser
- Dr. Skrimshtrb - John Boswall
- Tommy - Tony Rohr
- Michael - Roger Hume
- Arny - Brian Hall
- Napoleon - John Normington
- A Man in a Straitjacket - Mick Ford
- An Attendant - David Troughton

== Reception ==
The Spectator's Kenneth Hurren criticized the play and the performance after the Royal Court Theatre premiere, arguing that the work consists of two different plays that "do not so much blend with as disappear into each other" and saying that Courtenay "has a hard time with Clare".

In a 2001 article for The New York Times, Benedict Nightingale described The Fool as "moving". In 2006, Mark Ravenhill praised the boxing match as one of Bond's "brilliant images". Elizabeth Davis of Kilburn Times wrote, after seeing the 2010 performance directed by Bond, that "the play has powerful moments but the production was overly long (at 2hr 45mins) and, at times, as po-faced as the pompous vicar. Nevertheless, Bond, as ever, creates a memorable and thought-provoking evening." In the same year, Ravenhill lauded the play as a "brilliant [...] landmark" work and wrote, "There is no play that more acutely captures the experience of being a writer who is happily snatched up by London literary circles and then just as hastily dispatched".

Michael Billington of The Guardian called The Fool "a fine play" in a 2010 review of a different play. Lyn Gardner described it as "a very fine play about Clare" in the same paper. Playwright Nicholas Wright referred to it as a "great play". Pamela McCallum wrote in 2016 that the play "represents a high point of post-war British drama and perhaps can be taken as a site of division between generations in theatre. The following generation—Churchill, Ravenhill, Kane, and Butterworth—foreground, in very different ways, the psychological distortions and devastating brutalities of the contemporary world".

== Awards ==
The Fool won Best Play of 1976 in the Plays and Players London Critics Award.
