= Edward Bond =

English dramatist (1934–2024)

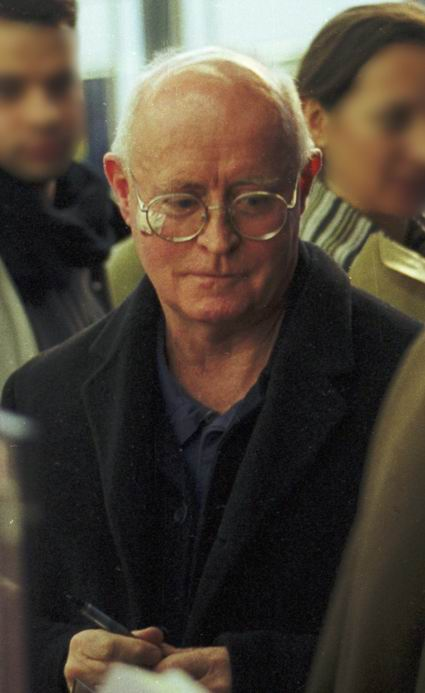
- Bond in 2001
- Born: Thomas Edward Bond; 18 July 1934; Holloway, London, England
- Died: 3 March 2024 (aged 89); Cambridge, England
- Occupations: Playwright; theatre director; poet; dramatic theorist; screenwriter
- Spouse: Elisabeth Pablé (m. 1971; died 2017)
- Writing career
- Language: English
- Period: 1958–2016
- Notable works: Saved (1965); Lear (1969); The Sea (1971); The Fool (1974)
- Notable awards: John Whiting Award (1968); Obie Award (1976)

Thomas Edward Bond (18 July 1934 – 3 March 2024) was an English playwright, theatre director, poet, dramatic theorist and screenwriter. He was the author of some 50 plays, among them Saved (1965), the production of which was instrumental in the abolition of theatre censorship in the UK. His other well-received works include Narrow Road to the Deep North (1968), Lear (1971), The Sea (1973), The Fool (1975), Restoration (1981), and the War Plays (1985). Bond was broadly considered among the major living dramatists but he has always been and remains highly controversial because of the violence shown in his plays, the radicalism of his statements about modern theatre and society, and his theories on drama.

== Early life ==
Thomas Edward Bond was born on 18 July 1934 into a lower-working-class family in Holloway, North London. As a child during World War II he was evacuated to the countryside, but witnessed the bombings on London in 1940 and 1944. This early exposure to the violence and terror of war probably shaped themes in his work, while his experience of the evacuation gave him an awareness of social alienation which would characterise his writing.

His first contact with theatre was music-hall, where his sister used to be sawn in two in a conjuror's sideshow. At fourteen, with his class he saw a performance of Shakespeare's Macbeth by Donald Wolfit which was revelatory. He later explained that this performance was the first time he had been presented with traumatic experiences comparable to his own in a way he could apprehend and give meaning to.

At fifteen, he left school with only a very basic education, something from which he derived a deep sense of social exclusion that contributed significantly to his political orientation. Bond then educated himself, driven by an impressive eagerness for knowledge. After various jobs in factories and offices, he did his national service in the British Army occupation forces in Vienna between 1953 and 1955. During his time in the army he discovered the naked violence hidden behind normal social behaviour, and decided to start writing.

Back in London, he educated himself in theatre while working, saw everything he could on stage and exercised his skill by writing drama sketches. He was especially impressed by the performances of the Berliner Ensemble in the summer of 1956. In June 1958, after submitting two plays to the Royal Court Theatre (The Fiery Tree and Klaxon in Atreus' Place, which Bond kept unpublished in perpetuity) he was invited to join its newly formed writers' group.

== 1960s – mid-1970s: first plays, Royal Court association ==
After three years studying with writers his age but already well-known (like John Arden, Arnold Wesker, and Ann Jellicoe), Bond had his first real play, The Pope's Wedding, staged as a Sunday night "performance without décor" at the Royal Court Theatre in 1962. This is a falsely naturalistic drama (the title refers to "an impossible ceremony") set in contemporary Essex which shows, through a set of tragic circumstances, the death of rural society brought about by modern post-war urban living standards. Michael Mangan writes in Edward Bond that The Pope's Wedding received "mixed but predominantly friendly reviews". Bernard Levin of Daily Mail lauded it as an "astonishing tour de force", but it was criticized in The Observer as "too elliptical". Jenny S. Spencer wrote in Dramatic Strategies in the Plays of Edward Bond that the play was praised as an "auspicious beginning for a new playwright". In 1980, academic Frances Rademacher listed it among Bond's major plays. In 2014, Michael Billington praised The Pope's Wedding as a "masterly" early play.

Bond considered his plays written for France's Théâtre National and the theatre-in-education company Big Brum to be his most important works. However, Benedict Nightingale of The New York Times wrote in 2001 that most critics consider Bond's best works to have been written between 1965 and 1978. A 2011 editorial in The Guardian claimed that "his later plays have often been glibly dismissed as Marxist parables". Graham Saunders argued that in Britain he was "most associated with work produced in the period from Saved to The Sea" and that later works are seen as minor, while in France he was equally well known for newer works. In 2005, Lyn Gardiner wrote that his body of work in the previous 20 years "stands alongside his classic plays". In 2007, Peter Billingham listed the later works Restoration, The War Trilogy, Coffee, and Born among the major plays. Billington argued that "even if in his later years Bond seems to start from a position of dogmatic certainty, he retains his ability to create durable images."

Bond's play Saved (1965) became one of the best known cause célèbres in 20th-century British theatre history. Saved delves into the lives of a selection of South London working-class youths suppressed – as Bond would see it – by a brutal economic system and unable to give their lives meaning, who drift eventually into barbarous mutual violence. Among them, one character, Len, persistently (and successfully) tries to maintain links between people violently tearing each other to pieces. The play shows the social causes of violence and opposes them with individual freedom. This would remain the major theme throughout Bond's work.

The play was directed by William Gaskill, then artistic director of the Royal Court. The Theatres Act 1843 was still in force and required scripts to be submitted for approval by the Lord Chamberlain's Office. Saved included a scene featuring the stoning to death of a baby in its pram. The Lord Chamberlain sought to censor it, but Bond refused to alter a word, claiming that removing this pivotal scene would alter the meaning of the play. He was firmly backed by Gaskill and the Royal Court although threatened with serious trouble. Formation of a theatre club normally allowed plays that had been banned for their language or subject matter to be performed under "club" conditions – such as that at the Comedy Theatre, however the English Stage Society were prosecuted. An active campaign sought to overturn the prosecution, with a passionate defence presented by Laurence Olivier, then artistic director of the National Theatre. The court found the English Stage Society guilty and they were given a conditional discharge.

Bond and the Royal Court continued to defy the censor, and in 1967 produced a new play, the surreal Early Morning. This portrays a lesbian relationship between Queen Victoria and Florence Nightingale, the royal Princes as Siamese twins, Disraeli and Prince Albert plotting a coup and the whole dramatis personae damned to a cannibalistic Heaven after falling off Beachy Head. The Royal Court produced the play despite the imposition of a total ban and within a year the law was finally repealed. In 1969, when the Royal Court was finally able to perform Bond's work legally, it put on and toured the three plays in Europe, winning the Belgrade International Theatre Festival prize. The experience of prosecution and mutual support sealed a link between Bond and the Royal Court where all his plays (except external commissions) would be premiered until 1976, most directed by Gaskill.

While Bond's work remained banned for performance in Britain, Saved became the greatest international success of its time with more than thirty different productions around the world between 1966 and 1969, often by notorious directors such as Peter Stein in Germany or Claude Régy in France. At that time, the play was controversial everywhere but is now considered as a 20th-century classic. Early Morning was initially panned but garnered praise from a number of writers in later years.

Bond then wrote a few commissioned works. The British Empire satire Narrow Road to the Deep North (1968), which received generally positive reviews, was for the Coventry People and City Festival. He wrote two agit-prop plays for festival performances, Black Mass (1970) to commemorate the Sharpeville massacre and Passion (1971) for the CND Easter Festival. A one-act play, the full text of Passion was printed in The New York Times the year it was first performed. Spencer described Black Mass and Passion as works with "power and humor". Bond composed Lear, based on Shakespeare's King Lear. The play follows the decay of an ageing tyrannical king. Betrayed by his two cynical daughters; hounded as a political risk following military defeat; pursued by the ghost of a man whose life he has destroyed and whose death he has caused; imprisoned and tortured until enucleated; after a life of violence he finally finds wisdom and peace in a radical opposition to power. The end of the play shows him as a forced labourer in a camp setting an example for future rebellion by sabotaging the wall he once built, which subsequent regimes keep perpetuating. David L. Hirst wrote that Lear divided both critics and audiences while Ronald Bryden reported that the play garnered acclaim from critics. Patrice Chéreau's 1975 production of the play "established Bond as a major contemporary figure in France".

In 1972, Charles Marowitz praised Bond as "one of the foremost writers of his generation, although you'd never think so if you lived in England, a country which treats him with a disdain that would be inconceivable on the Continent. [...] On the Continent, where there is a long tradition of political theater, these works are instinctively understood."

The subdued Edwardian-set comedy The Sea (1973) shows a seaside community on England's East Coast a few years before World War I, dominated by a dictatorial woman and overwhelmed by the drowning of one of its young citizens. Nurtured by his experience as a child evacuee to the seaside, the play is subtitled "a comedy" and was intended as optimistic after the gloomy mood of his previous plays. This is encapsulated by the successful escape of a young and promising couple from this narrow and oppressive society. This play would be the last of Bond's plays that was directed by Gaskill.

In 1974 Bond translated Spring Awakening (1891) by the German playwright Frank Wedekind, about the suppression of adolescent sexuality. The play had always been censored or presented with major cuts since its writing, and Bond's was the first translation to restore Wedekind's original text, including its most controversial scenes.

Bond then produced two pieces exploring the place of the artist in society. Bingo (1974) portrayed the retired Shakespeare as an exploitative landlord, an impotent yet compassionate witness of social violence, who eventually commits suicide, repeatedly asking himself "Was anything done?". The Fool (1975) reinterprets the life of the rural 19th century poet John Clare. It involves Clare in the Littleport Riots of 1816, and then makes his own poetry the depository of the spirit of this rural rebellion against the growth of modern industrial capitalism. The failure of this historical class war eventually drives him to a madhouse. In 1976 Bingo won the Obie award as Best Off-Broadway play and The Fool was voted best play of the year by Plays and Players.

== 1970s – mid-1980s: broader scope, political experiments ==
Bond remained a successful playwright in England all through the 1970s, expanding his range of writing and his collaborations. His plays were requested by institutional and community theatres, for premieres and revivals, and he was commissioned to write plays both by renowned institutions and fringe activist companies. For example, in 1976 he wrote, on one hand Stone and A-A-America (pronounced as a sneeze), two agit-prop-style plays, respectively for Gay Sweatshop and the Almost Free Theatre and, on the other, an adaptation of Webster's The White Devil for Michael Lindsay-Hogg to re-open the Old Vic and a libretto for the German composer Hans Werner Henze to open at the Royal Opera House in Covent Garden: We Come to the River. (In 1982 the pair collaborated again, less successfully on another opera, The English Cat.) Ann Marie Demling wrote that in A-A-America! "Bond borrows cleverly and skillfully from the caricature and dialect of the American tall-tale and folk legend." She found Stone "problematic in structure because Bond couches the theme in the framework of pseudo-Biblical allegory. [...] The play deals with many complex issues difficult to express in the rather clear-cut nature of allegory."

However, Bond's working relationship with the Royal Court progressively slackened, and by the mid-1970s he had found a new partner in the Royal Shakespeare Company (RSC). Beginning with Bingo in 1976, the RSC revived and toured his plays regularly until the early 1990s, and Bond, though often disagreeing with the aesthetic choices of its productions or protesting at not being consulted sufficiently, recognized the genuine support the company gave to his work. In 1977 the RSC commissioned a new play for the opening of their new London theatre, the Warehouse, which would be The Bundle. Set in an imaginary medieval Japan and based on an anecdote from the classical Japanese poet Bashō, the play shows an eventually successful revolution whose leader nevertheless constantly faces the human cost of political change and experiences as futile an ideology of compassion, being (in Bond's view) politically counterproductive and supportive of reactionary violence. Richard Eder criticized The Bundle as "a thin political parable made up from ingredients that we have been served before. It is a warmedover Brecht fast. [...] The language has been stripped, but for emptiness rather than leanness." In 1996, D. J. R. Bruckner panned an Irondale Ensemble Project performance as "utterly frustrating". While praising the choreography and direction, Bruckner said that "one finds it impossible to say what it was all about" and described the philosophizing of the last hour as "portentous". However, in a 1998 review of the fifth collection of Bond plays, Richard Boon called The Bundle "a genuine and shamefully-neglected masterpiece, worth the cost of purchase by itself".

Bond assigned the same political concern to his next play, The Woman, set in a fantasy Trojan War and based on Euripides' Trojan Women. Comparable to Lear, it shows the fight of the decayed Trojan queen, Hecuba, against the Athenian empire, succeeding only when she abandons the aristocracy and the interests of the state to physically meet the proletariat and join the people's cause.

In 1977, Bond accepted an honorary doctorate in letters from Yale University (although, thirty years previously, he had not been allowed to sit for his eleven-plus examination) and he began to take up students workshops in Newcastle, Durham and Birmingham, for which he wrote several plays. The most accomplished among them was The Worlds, written for the Newcastle University Theatre Society, based on the recent events in the UK, both the Northern Ireland conflict and the social crisis of the winter of Discontent. Reception was mixed. Demling, noting that audience reactions to the most controversial scene in Saved partially resulted from its break in style from previous episodes' domestic realism, listed The Worlds as an example of a work in which Bond "integrates the grotesque more successfully into the plot."

His early 1980s plays were directly influenced by the coming to power of the Conservative Party led by Margaret Thatcher and the profound social changes they were bringing about. Restoration, as a half-musical parody of Restoration comedies, deals with working-class support for the Tories by showing a servant accepting his conviction and eventual execution for a murder committed by his cynical and silly master. Restoration has sometimes been viewed as one of the best of Bond's later plays. Summer deals with the moral ambiguities of capitalism through the conflict of two women in socialist Yugoslavia. One is the daughter of former landlords, whose compassionate nature does not prevent them from being exploiters and collaborationists during the German occupation. The other, the daughter of servants, rejects the values of the former, whom she once saved from a firing squad. Derek, written for a youth festival, alludes directly to the Falklands War and shows an idiotic aristocrat stealing the brain of a gifted worker and sending him to die in a war in a country that "sounds like the name of a disease".

== Controversial directing attempts, quarrels with institutions ==
During the late 1970s, Bond felt he needed practical contact with the stage to experiment with his ideas on drama and improve his writing. He therefore began directing his own plays and progressively he made this a condition of their first production. After staging Lear in German at the Burgtheater, in Vienna in 1973, Bond directed his last four plays in London between 1978 and 1982: The Worlds and Restoration at the Royal Court and The Woman and Summer at the National Theatre. These latter two introduced the South African actress Yvonne Bryceland, whom Bond admired, considering her the ideal female interpreter. In 2002, Christopher Innes criticized Summer, as well as Human Cannon and Jackets II, as examples of a problem in Bond's later plays of protagonists who are either virtuous or evil, lacking complexity. Innes dubbed Restoration the "only play to rise above this simplification in the recent phase of Bond's career". Frank Rich of The New York Times also panned Summer in 1983 as "pallid and inept", and "torpid [...] As characters, Xenia and Marthe do not have the depth that might relieve some of the tedium. Mr. Bond's deterministic view of society reduces them to symbols".

The Woman was the first contemporary play performed in the recently opened Olivier auditorium and the production was acclaimed as an aesthetic success, especially for its innovative use of the huge open stage. David L. Hirst wrote that in the play Bond "skilfully reworks The Trojan Women so as to cast the image of that society into the present and inform contemporary political opinion." Adam Thorpe called the play "magnificent" in 2006. However, Bond's working relationships as a director with both the National Theatre and the Royal Court were highly conflicted. The theatres and their actors accused him of being authoritarian and abstract in his direction and unrealistic in his production requirements, and Bond complained undiplomatically about their lack of artistic engagement and had crude rows both with some reluctant actors and theatre managers. He felt that British theatre had no understanding of his intention to revitalise modern drama and could no longer fulfil his artistic demands.

With his notoriously uncompromising attitude, Bond gained the reputation of a "difficult author", which contributed to keeping him away from the major English stages. During the mid-1980s, Peter Hall at the National Theatre repeatedly refused to allow him to direct his new play Human Cannon, written for Yvonne Bryceland and the wide stage of the Olivier. Richard Boon described Human Cannon as "very good".

In 1985, he attempted to direct his War Plays at the RSC, accepting very bad working conditions, but left the rehearsals before the premiere after disastrous sessions, and then violently criticized the production and the theatre. Max Stafford-Clark has written that with the Barbican production of The War Plays, Bond "reduced a talented cast into a stumbling and incoherent shambles of walking wounded. Edward Bond is simply the most difficult person I have worked with in 40 years." He then decided not to allow his plays to be premiered in London by institutional theatres without proper working conditions. He only agreed to return to the RSC in 1996 when he directed In the Company of Men, but considered this production a failure. He nevertheless regularly accepted revivals and sometimes got involved in these productions, although remaining generally unsatisfied, and he directed workshops for RSC actors with Cicely Berry. Except for two plays written for the BBC in the early 1990s (Olly's Prison and Tuesday), Bond continued writing plays in the knowledge that they would not be staged in Britain except by amateur companies.

These conflicts are still highly controversial, and Bond and those with whom he had clashed continued to settle scores in letters, books and interviews.

== 1980s turning point ==
Nevertheless, in the mid-1980s, Bond's work had a new beginning with the trilogy of The War Plays. Motivated by the threats of the last years of the Cold War and the political activism it provoked in Britain and Europe, Bond had planned to write about nuclear war since the early 1980s. He found a means to do so after testing a storyline with Sicilian students in Palermo. To point to the barbarity of a society which planned to kill the enemy's children to protect their own (that being how he saw the logic of nuclear deterrence), he suggested an improvisation in which a soldier was ordered to kill a child of his community to curb mass starvation. According to Bond, each student who improvised as the soldier refused to kill a foreign child and paradoxically returned home to kill their own sibling instead. He saw in this a deeply rooted force in the individual preserving an innate sense of justice that he theorized as 'Radical Innocence'. Subsequently, he built on this concept a comprehensive theory of drama in its anthropological and social role that he intended to go beyond Brecht's theories on political drama. This discovery also gave him the key to write on nuclear war, not just to condemn the atrocity of war in a general way but, from a political perspective, questioning public acceptance of it and collaboration with it by ordinary citizens.

Between 1984 and 1985 he wrote three plays to meet various requests, which he united as The War Plays. The first, Red Black and Ignorant (written for a Festival dedicated to George Orwell), is a short agitprop play in which a child, aborted and burnt to death in the nuclear global bombings, comes from the future to accuse the society of the audience of his murder. The second, The Tin Can People (written for a young activists' company), denounces capitalist society's ideology of death. It shows a community of survivors living on an infinite supply of canned food running berserk when they feel threatened by a stranger and destroying all they have as in a reduced nuclear war. The third, Great Peace (written for the RSC) re-enacts the Palermo improvisation in a city barely surviving in the aftermath of nuclear bombardment. It focuses on a soldier who kills his baby sister and his mother who tries to kill her neighbour's child to save her own. The play then follows her twenty years later, in the sterile global wilderness that nuclear war has made of the world, where she rebuilds her humanity bit by bit by meeting other survivors.

Mangan commented that the 1995 Odéon-Théâtre de l'Europe performance of The War Plays was quite successful, and that in France the work "was described as the most important play written since the Second World War." In 1996, however, Janelle G. Reinelt described the reception as "chilly".

These desperate efforts to stay human or be human anew in an inhuman situation would be the purpose of most of the characters in Bond's subsequent plays, the scope of which will be to explore the limits and possibilities of humanity. His next play, Jackets, again uses the Palermo improvisation and sets up a confrontation between two young men manipulated by military conspiracies, first in medieval Japan, then in contemporary urban riots. Sometimes the portion in medieval Japan and the portion in Britain are referred to as Jackets I and II, respectively. The Guardian's theatre reviewer Robin Thornber praised Jackets as "an astonishingly powerful piece of political, polemical poetry". In 1993, Christine Shade listed The War Plays and Jackets as Bond's "best-known works". In 1998, Richard Boon dubbed Jackets a "very good" play (as he did with Human Cannon). However, Maxie Szalwinska wrote in The Guardian, after watching a performance at Theatre503, that "the awareness that this is minor stuff slowly but surely leaks in. [...] his weakness for point-making gets in the way of his characters."

In the Company of Men shows a desperate fight by the adoptive son of an armaments factory manager to be who he is in a cynical, intrigue-ridden neo-liberal business world that Bond considers the mirror of our post-modern times. While In the Company of Men was a critical and commercial success in France, Jenny Kowalski noted that the RSC production received almost overwhelmingly negative reviews, explaining that it "was the language of the long speeches, both in its detail and in its sheer quantity, that proved to be the stumbling block for most critics." Kowalski praised "Bond's fine sense of style and rhythm" and argued that "one of the points made by the play is that we are moving towards a future where the huge multinationals will control all production indiscriminately"; however, the critic said that "the contrasting moods of the text were missed in performance: the black farce of Oldfield's demise, for instance, did not seem to be appreciated as such". Anthony Jenkins dismissed the play as "a rambling, self indulgent account of post-modern society".

Paul Taylor of The Independent called the play "interminable" and wrote, "Bond does not seem to have acquired the ability to distinguish between the genuine moments of surreal comedy in the script and the parts where it is straight-facedly unaware of its side-splitting potential. [...] It's an indictment of something (the English institutions that now turn down Bond's scripts or the scripts themselves for being – for all one knows – so turndownable) that a dramatist of his penetration should have lost contact with an English audience's psychology to this degree."

In Olly's Prison, a man who has killed his daughter and forgotten his crime tries to find meaning in his life. Olly's Prison divided critics. In Tuesday, a young deserter tries to tell the truth about the war but is destroyed by society. More innovative in structure, Coffee exposes the cultural roots of violence. It contrasts an initial, imaginary section resembling a gloomy fairy tale, in which a mother kills her child because she can no longer feed her, with a second, realistic part reproducing the historical Babi Yar massacre, where the same characters are among the victims. As in the Palermo improvisation, a soldier realises he cannot shoot the victims any more, and eventually decides instead to shoot his officer and escape with the girl. Saunders listed Coffee as one of the later works for which Bond is well known in France. The Independent's Carl Miller dubbed it "dense, theatrically sophisticated writing", and a powerful play. Adrian Turpin reported being "defeated by large chunks of [the scene that] dominates the play's first half". Turpin said that Bond's humanism at times "breaks through his rhetoric, shedding a ray of light on the text's opacity", but deemed the play impenetrable. Benedict Nightingale said that most Bond plays from The Worlds onward "tended to combine vivid observation with a preachy radicalism that could take disconcertingly hardline forms" but praised Coffee (and The Crime of the 21st Century) as much livelier works.

== Later years ==
From 1997 to 2008, Bond's plays explored in depth a gloomy vision of a future society (in 2077) where the potential menaces of social breakdown and bio-political control have become real and structural. The first in this cycle, The Crime of the 21st Century, shows a few outcasts who have fled the over-controlled cities to hide in a no-man's-land where they try in vain to rebuild their humanity by creating a semblance of community. Gerry Colgan wrote in The Irish Times that The Crime of the 21st Century "ends on an odd note of anti-climactic ritual. It is clear that the author intends his play to be deeply meaningful, and to explore issues such as justice, freedom and interpersonal dependency. Little of this comes across as the characters address each other in artificial dialogue and the plot becomes steadily more improbable [...] a leaden, pretentious play."

Have I None, Chair and The Under Room show the monotonous life of the cities, where social relationships and memory have been abolished, consumption and possession standardized, and where people are harassed by the resistance of their imagination and panicked by strangers. Born and Innocence follow the actions of militarized policemen, the 'Wapos', who perpetrate atrocities on reluctant civilians during mass deportations, but some of whom try to find a human dimension to their lives and desperately attempt to escape the alienated and criminal conditions they are trapped in.

Though isolated from the institutional British theatres, Bond found two new partners in the mid-1990s who would keep alive his impulse for writing. One was the Birmingham-based theatre-in-education company Big Brum, of which he remained an associate artist. From 1995 to 2009, he wrote seven very different plays dedicated to young audiences for this company: At the Inland Sea (1995), in which a youth confronts the legacy of the holocaust; Eleven Vests (1997), on scholastic and military authoritarianism; Have I None (2000), The Balancing Act (2003), The Under Room (2005), Tune (2007) and A Window (2009). Big Brum appeared to be the only professional company in England for more than two decades that Bond openly wrote for and allowed to premiere his plays. This collaboration has brought Bond's theories on drama to broader attention in England, where they are now relayed by the National Association for Teaching of Drama. In 1999, he wrote The Children to be played by pupils at Manor Community College in Cambridge. This other contribution to drama intended for young audiences has been performed ever since in many schools and theatres in England and abroad and counts as one of Bond's international successes.

Sarah Ratliff said that Bond is trying to argue in Eleven Vests that "we are responsible for our actions. [...] The characters could be developed more; it is very hard to empathize with the Student because the audience doesn't really know him. We know his actions, and they are deplorable, but we don't really understand him. Perhaps this was the playwright's intent. We still hope that the Student will change, will become better, but when he doesn't, we then have to look inward to ourselves and begin the questioning process. Edward Bond does a good job of pushing us toward this point." Conversely, it was claimed in a text released on the Savitribai Phule Pune University website that "Bond wants to bring out how school and family – the very institutions which are supposed to benevolently nurture childhood – start corrosively exercising repressive ownership and control of the child-self and yet the society is so ideologically blinded towards such occurrences that we talk endlessly about adolescent crimes and the problem of the irresponsible youth."

Bond's other partnership during his final years was with French director Alain Françon who premiered In the Company of Men in 1992 and produced an acclaimed version of The War Plays at the Festival d'Avignon in 1994, re-introducing Bond's work to France, where his plays and theory have since become highly influential. Françon continued to promote Bond's work when he was head of the Théâtre national de la Colline in Paris from 1997 to 2010 and, with strong support and involvement from Bond, staged Coffee, The Crime of the 21st Century, Have I None, Born and Chair. To Françon and his actors Bond dedicated People and Innocence, which, with Have I None, Coffee and The Crime of the 21st Century, he called The Colline Pentad and considered his major project of that decade.

Chair was praised in Exeunt, Variety, TheaterMania, and The Guardian, but criticized in Financial Times and The New York Times. Of A Window, Lyn Gardner wrote, "This is a knotty and uncomfortable play of austere poetry and vision, written by a playwright who is like a latter-day Tiresias: sometimes gnomic, but seldom wrong". Gardner described the play as having "understated power". In 2002, Arthur Smith said of Existence, "It was all so powerful and demanding that at the end of it I fell into a disturbed sleep for an hour and a half." In 2005, David Davis lauded Born as "perhaps his greatest play to date".

During the early years of the 21st century, there was renewed worldwide interest in Bond's work and ideas on drama. In France, he held several conferences with participants drawn from a wide audience, directed many workshops in Paris and elsewhere, and was the most performed playwright after Molière (according to Lynne Walker in 2005). He was invited to take part in conferences and workshops all over Europe and America. In the United States, Robert Woodruff and the American Repertory Theatre produced Olly's Prison in 2005; Woodruff also directed Saved (2001) and Chair (2008) at Theatre for a New Audience in New York City. In Germany, interest in his plays has remained high since the 1970s. In Britain, his plays are now regularly revived in community theatre and in 2008, he enjoyed his first West End production in a career of almost fifty years with Jonathan Kent's revival of The Sea at the Theatre Royal Haymarket, with David Haig and Eileen Atkins. Among recent productions of his work have been revivals of Lear at the Crucible Theatre Sheffield featuring Ian McDiarmid and Restoration with added songs, toured in early 2006 by the Oxford Stage Company.

During the autumn of 2010, The Cock Tavern Theatre in London produced six of his plays simultaneously (one chosen from each decade), including a new one, provisionally entitled There Will Be More, commissioned for this occasion and performed although unfinished. Notably, Bond himself directed a revival of The Fool and took over the direction of There Will Be More. The Guardian's Lyn Gardner wrote, "There is some hard, unflinching writing here, but uncertain performances and an awkward, often unintentionally comic production make this seem perilously close to a parody of an Edward Bond play." Conversely, Mark Taylor of The Independent wrote that "as its plot takes the path of least resistance between one primal convulsion after another, this starkly eloquent, theatrically knowing play stretches credulity to snapping point. [...] It's no wonder that the tone of Adam Spreadbury-Maher's unsparing, production teeters uncertainly at times between seriousness and melodramatic spoof." Also, Ian Shuttleworth of Financial Times panned the first 20 minutes of the latter play as "a parody of the work of Edward Bond" and the rest of the play as "more of the same [...] this is apparently part of a much longer work (be afraid, be very afraid) examining the inadequacy of modern drama. But it does not examine this; nor does it act as a moral conscience, indict our complacency or anything of that ilk."

The Lyric Hammersmith presented the first London production of Bond's Saved for 27 years in autumn 2011 in a production by the venue's Artistic Director Sean Holmes. 2012 saw two new plays performed by Big Brum Theatre in Education Company; The Broken Bowl and The Edge. Both of these plays were filmed and made available online. In 2014, Big Brum Theatre in Education Company presented its tenth new Bond play, The Angry Roads. His 2016 play Dea was panned in The Stage and The Times, with Dominic Maxwell of the latter publication referring to it as "awful". Conversely, Tom Bolton of Londonist argued: "Dea is not just a shock-fest — the play is a deep, poetic, complex investigation of the condition of 21st century society."

In 2013, he accepted an honorary doctorate in letters from Newman University, Birmingham. He was an honorary associate of the National Secular Society.

== Personal life and death ==
Bond was married to Elisabeth Pablé from 1971 until her death in 2017. They lived in Great Wilbraham, Cambridgeshire.

Bond died in Cambridge on 3 March 2024, at the age of 89.

== Publications ==
Since the early 1970s, Bond has been conspicuous as the first dramatist since George Bernard Shaw to produce long, serious prose prefaces to his plays.

These contain the author's meditations on capitalism, violence, technology, post-modernism and imagination and develop a comprehensive theory on the use and means of drama. Nine volumes of his Collected Plays, including the prefaces, are available from the UK publisher Methuen.

In 1999 he published The Hidden Plot, a collection of writings on theatre and the meaning of drama. He has published two volumes from his notebooks and four volumes of letters. His Collected Poems was published in 1987.

== Contribution to cinema ==
In the late 1960s/early 1970s Bond also made some contributions to the cinema. He wrote the English dialogue for Blowup (1966, directed by Michelangelo Antonioni), for which he received a joint Oscar nomination for Best Original Screenplay. He also wrote an adaptation of Nabokov's Laughter in the Dark (1968, dir. Tony Richardson) and the screenplay for the aboriginal drama Walkabout (1971, dir. Nicolas Roeg); as well as contributing additional dialogue to Nicholas and Alexandra (1971, dir. Franklin J. Schaffner). Except for Antonioni's Blowup, Bond himself considered these works strictly as potboilers and often became frustrated when further involved in cinema projects. Bond contributed to the 2024 film The Return (2024 film) which he co-wrote with John Collee.

== List of works ==
Plays

(Dates of writing, followed by director, place and date of world première, if any)

- The Pope's Wedding (1961–62) Keith Johnstone, Royal Court Theatre, London, 9 December 1962
- Saved (1964) William Gaskill, English Stage Society, Royal Court Theatre, London, 3 November 1965
- Early Morning (1965–1967) William Gaskill, English Stage Society, Royal Court Theatre London, 31 March 1968
- Narrow Road to the Deep North (1968) Jane Howell, Belgrade Theatre, Coventry, 24 June 1968
- Black Mass (1970) David Jones, Lyceum Theatre, London, 22 March 1970
- Passion "a Play for CND" (1971) Bill Bryden, au CND Festival of Life on Easter, Alexandra Park Racecourse, 11 April 1971
- Lear (1969–1971) William Gaskill, Royal Court Theatre London, 29 September 1971
- The Sea "a comedy" (1971–72) William Gaskill, Royal Court Theatre London, 22 May 1973
- Bingo "scenes of money and death" (1973) Jane Howell & John Dove, Northcott Theatre, November Exeter, 14 1973
- The Fool "scenes of bread and love" (1974) Peter Gill, Royal Court Theatre London, 18 November 1975
- A-A-America !: Grandma Faust "a burlesque" and The Swing "a documentary" (1976) Jack Emery, Inter-Action's Ambiance Lunch-Hour Theatre Club, Almost Free Theatre, London. Grandma Faust: 25 October; The Swing: 22 November 1976
- Stone "a short Play" (1976) Gerald Chapman, Gay Sweatshop, Institute of Contemporary Arts, London, 8 June 1976
- The Woman "scenes of war and freedom" (1974–1977) Edward Bond, National Theatre (Olivier Stage), London, 10 August 1978
- The Bundle or New Narrow Road to the Deep North (1977) Howard Davies, Royal Shakespeare Company, The Warehouse Theatre, London, 13 January 1978
- The Worlds (1979) Edward Bond, Newcastle University Theatre Society, Newcastle Playhouse, 8 March 1979
- Restoration "a pastorale" (1979–80) Edward Bond, Royal Court Theatre, London, 22 July 1981
- Summer "a European play" (1980–81) Edward Bond, National Theatre (Cottlesloe Stage), London, 27 January 1982
- Derek (1982) Nick Hamm, Royal Shakespeare Company, The Other Place, Stratford On Avon, 18 October 1982
- Human Cannon (1979–1983) Dan Baron Cohen, Quantum Theatre Company, Manchester, 2 February 1986
- The War Plays: Red Black and Ignorant (1983–84) Nick Hamm (as The Unknown Citizen), Royal Shakespeare Company, pour le festival "Thoughtcrimes", Barbican Pit, London, 19 January 1984; The Tin Can People (1984) Nick Philippou, Bread and Circus Theatre, Midlands Art Centre, Birmingham, 4 May 1984; Great Peace (1984–85) Nick Hamm, Royal Shakespeare Company, Barbican Pit, London, 17 July 1985; premiered as a trilogy: Nick Hamm, Royal Shakespeare Company, Barbican Pit, London, 25 July 1985
- Jackets or The Secret Hand (1986) Keith Sturgess, Department of Theatre Studies, University of Lancaster, Nuffield studio, Lancaster, 24 January 1989
- In the Company of Men (1987–88) Alain Françon (as La Compagnie des hommes), Théâtre de la Ville, Paris, 29 September 1992
- September (1989) Greg Doran, Canterbury Cathedral, Canterbury, 16 September 1989
- Olly's Prison (1990) (stage version) Jorge Lavelli (as Maison d'arrêt), Festival d'Avignon, 15 July 1993
- Tuesday (stage version) Claudia Stavisky (as Mardi), Théâtre de la Colline, Paris, 23 November 1995
- Coffee "a tragedy" (1993–94) Dan Baron Cohen, The Rational Theatre Company, Chapter Art Centre, Cardiff, 27 November 1996
- At the Inland Sea (1995) Geoff Gillham, Big Brum Theatre in Education Company, Broadway School, Aston, Birmingham, 16 October 1995
- Eleven Vests (1995–1997) Geoff Gillham, Big Brum Theatre in Education Company, Birmingham, 7 October 1997
- The Crime of the twenty-first Century (1996–1998) Leander Haussman (as Das Verbrechen des 21. Jahrhunderts), Schauspielhaus, Bochum, 28 May 1999
- The Children (1999) Claudette Bryanston, Classwork Theatre, Manor Community College, Cambridge, 11 February 2000
- Have I None (2000) Chris Cooper, Big Brum Theatre-in-Education Company, Birmingham, 2 November 2000
- Existence (2002) (stage version) Christian Benedetti, Studio Théâtre, Alfortville, 28 October 2002
- Born (2002–03) Alain Françon (as Naître), Festival d'Avignon, 10 July 2006
- The Balancing Act (2003) Chris Cooper, Big Brum Theatre in Education Company, Birmingham, October 2003
- The Short Electra (2003–04) John Doona, Young People Drama Festival, 13 March 2004
- People (2005), Alain Françon (as "Les Gens") Théâtre Gérard Philipe, Paris, 13 January 2014
- The Under Room (2005) Chris Cooper, Big Brum Theatre in Education Company, 9 October 2005
- Chair, stage version (2005) Alain Françon (as Chaise) Festival d'Avignon, 18 July 2006
- Arcade (2006) John Doona, Chester, 21 September 2006
- Tune (2006) Chris Cooper, Big Brum Theatre in Education Company, 2007
- Innocence (2008), unperformed
- A Window (2009) Chris Cooper, Big Brum Theatre in Education Company, 12 October 2009
- There Will Be More (2010) (early version of the first part of Dea) Adam Spreadbury-Maher, Good Night Out Presents, The Cock Tavern Theatre, 26 October 2010
- The Edge (2011) Chris Cooper, Big Brum Theatre in Education Company, 15 October 2012
- The Broken Bowl (2012) Chris Cooper, Big Brum Theatre in Education Company, 24 April 2012
- The Angry Roads (2014) Chris Cooper, Big Brum Theatre in Education Company, 6 October 2014
- The Price of One (2016) Chris Cooper, Unifaun Theatre Productions & Teatru Manoel, Manoel Theatre, Valletta (Malta), 8 April 2016
- Dea (2016) Edward Bond, Secombe Theatre (Sutton Theatres), Sutton, 26 May 2016

Television plays

- Olly's Prison (1990), shot in December 1991 (Roy Battersby), broadcast: BBC2, May 1993
- Tuesday (1992), shot in March 1993 (Sharon Miller and Edward Bond), broadcast: BBC Schools Television, June 1993

Radio plays

- Chair (2000), broadcast: BBC Radio 4, 8 April 2000 (Turan Ali, Director/Producer)
- Existence (2002), broadcast: BBC Radio 4, May 2002 (Turan Ali, Director/Producer)

Unavailable early plays

- The Tragedy, for television, 1950s
- "He jumped but the bridge was burning", 1950s
- The Asses of Kish, 1956–57
- Too Late Now, for television, c. 1957
- The Broken Shepherdess, for radio, c. 1958
- Sylo's New Ruins, for television, c. 1958
- The Performance for television, c. 1958
- The Best Laid Schemes, for television, c. 1958
- A Woman Weeping, c. 1957
- The Roller Coaster, c. 1958
- Klaxon in Aetreus' Place, 1958
- The Fiery Tree, 1958
- I Don't Want to Be Nice, 1959
- The Golden Age, 1959
- The Outing, 1959–60
- Kissing The Beast, for radio, 1960
- The Palace of Varieties in the Sand, 1975–76

Libretti for operas by Hans Werner Henze

- We Come to the river "Actions for Music in Two Parts and Eleven Scenes", 1972/74, in The Fool, Londres, Eyre Methuen, 1976
- The Cat "a story for music", 1979, in Restoration, London, Methuen, 1982, from Honoré de Balzac's Peines d'amour d'une chatte anglaise, music by H.W. Henze; recorded as: The English Cat, "Ein Geschichte für Sänger und Instrumentalisten von Edward Bond", Parnassus Orchestra London, dir.: Markus Stenz-Peter Doll, Mayence, Wergo, 2 CD, WER 62042, 1989

Libretti for ballets

- Text for a Ballet: for Dancers, Chorus and Orchestra (1977), partially published as From an Unfinished Ballet, in Theatre Poems and Songs, London, Methuen, 1980
- Orpheus "a story in six scenes" (1977/78), music by Hans Werner Henze, for William Forsythe
- Burns "a piece for dancers and musicians" (1985), for Midland Ballet Company

Adaptations from other authors

- Thomas Middleton: A Chaste Maid in Cheapside (1965)
- Anton Chekhov: Three Sisters (1966), with Richard Cottrell, for William Gaskill
- Bertolt Brecht: Heads (Round Heads and Pick Heads) (c. 1970), with Keith Hack, inédit,
- John Webster: The White Devil (1976), "Acting Edition" for Michael Lindsay-Hogg
- Frank Wedekind: Spring Awakening (1974), with Elisabeth Bond-Pablé, for Bill Bryden
- Frank Wedekind: Lulu (1992), with Elisabeth Bond-Pablé, for Cambridge Theatre Company

Screenplays

- Blowup, from Julio Cortázar, dir: Michelangelo Antonioni, 1967
- Michael Kolhaas – der Rebell, from H. von Kleist, dir: Volker Schlöndorff, 1968
- The Nun of Monza (English language version dialogue), dir: Eriprando Visconti, 1969
- Laughter in the Dark, from V. Nabokov, dir: Tony Richardson, 1969
- Walkabout, from J. Vance Marshall, dir: Nicolas Roeg, 1971
- Nicholas and Alexandra (additional dialogue), dir: Franklin J. Schaffner, 1971
- Days of Fury (a.k.a. One Russian Summer), with U. Pirro and A. Calenda, dir: Antonio Calenda, 1973
- The Master Builder, from H. Ibsen, unperformed, 1974-75
- Moby Dick, from H.Melville, 1991, unperformed
- The Return, from Homer, 1998–99, dir: Uberto Pasolini, 2024

=== Editions ===
Plays ("uniformed edition"; nine volumes by Methuen, London)

- Plays: 1 (1977): Author's note: On Violence; Saved, Early morning; Pope's Wedding
- Plays: 2 (1978): Introduction; Preface to Lear; Lear; The Sea; Narrow Road to The Deep North, Black Mass; Passion
- Plays: 3 (1987): Four Pieces; Introduction to Bingo, Bingo; Introduction to The Fool; The Fool; Clare Poems; The Woman; Poems, Stories and Essays for The Woman; Author's note; Stone
- Plays: 4 (1992): The Worlds; The Activists Papers; Restoration; Restoration Poems and Stories; Summer; Summer Poems
- Plays: 5 (1996): Human Cannon, The Bundle; In the Company of Men; Jackets
- Plays: 6 (1998): Choruses from After the Assassinations; War Plays; Commentary on the War Plays
- Plays: 7 (2003): The Cap; The Crime of the Twenty-first Century; Olly's Prison; Notes on Imagination; Coffee; The Swing; Derek; Fables and Stories
- Plays: 8 (2006): Born, People, Chair, Existence, The Under Room
- Plays: 9 (2011): Innocence, Window, Tune, Balancing Act, The Edge
- Plays: 10 (2018): Dea, The Testament of this Day, The Price of One, The Angry Roads, The Hungry Bowl

Other plays (by Methuen, London)

- Lear, Student Edition, with Commentary and Notes by Patricia Hern (1983)
- Olly's Prison, stage and TV version (1993)
- At the Inland Sea (1997)
- Eleven Vests with Tuesday (1997)
- The Children with Have I None (2001)
- Saved, Student Edition, with Commentary and Notes by David Davis (2008)
- The Chair Plays: Have I None, The Under Room and Chair (2012)
- Dea (2016)

==== Selected drama theory writings ====
- A Note on Dramatic Method (1977), in: The Bundle, London, Methuen, 1978
- The Activists Papers (1980) in Plays 4, London, Methuen, 1992
- Introduction, for The Fool, in Plays 3, London, Methuen, 1987
- The Dramatic Child (1992), in Tuesday, London, Methuen, 1992
- Notes on Imagination, in: Coffee, London, Methuen, 1995
- Notes on Post-modernism (1989) in: Plays 5, London, Methuen, 1996
- Bond, Edward (1998). "Commentary on The War Plays". Plays 6. Methuen. ISBN 1-4725-3670-3.
- The Hidden Plot Notes on Theatre and the State, London, Methuen, 2000
- Drama Devices (2004), in David Davis (ed.): Edward Bond and the Dramatic Child, Edward Bond's Plays for Young People, London, Trentham Books, 2005
- "Something of Myself" (2004), in David Davis (ed.): Edward Bond and the Dramatic Child, Edward Bond's Plays for Young People, London, Trentham Books, 2005

Letters, selected and edited by Ian Stuart:

- I, Harwood Academic Publishers, 1994
- II, Luxembourg, Harwood Academic Publishers, 1995
- III, Amsterdam, Harwood Academic Publishers, 1996
- 4, Amsterdam, Harwood Academic Publishers, 1998
- 5, London, Routledge, 2001

Selections from Edward Bond's Notebooks, edited by Ian Stuart, London, Methuen,

- vol. 1: 1959–1980, 2000
- vol. 2: 1980–1995, 2000

== See also ==
- List of British playwrights
