= Claudette Bryanston =

English theatre director

Claudette Bryanston is an English theatre director and practitioner of applied drama.

== Biography ==
Bryanston has an MA in Contemporary Performance from Middlesex University.

In 1983 she co-founded Classworks Theatre Company, Cambridge. Classworks was initially the first youth theatre in Cambridge, meeting at the ADC Theatre and securing the first patronage given by HRH Prince Edward, Duke of Edinburgh. Its productions toured to Germany, Finland, Poland and the Edinburgh Festival Fringe. In 1988 it won the first ever award given by The Independent for Best Production with The Heart of a Dog, by Mikhail Bulgakov.

Bryanston is the artistic director of Santé Theatre and Media company which she founded in 2000. In 2003 she was appointed a Senior Research Fellow in Creativity and Performance at the Institute of Health at the University of Warwick. From November 2008 to June 2009 she was also the Warwick University/Royal Shakespeare Company Fellow in Creativity and Performance. She is also Artistic Director of Stamp Theatre and Media Productions which has been nominated for a Royal Television Society award. Past projects include the play Cracked Directed by Bryanston, it is an example of verbatim theatre also interspersed with poetry by Poet Laureate for Birmingham Symphony Hall, Julie Boden.

Bryanston was appointed Guest Director of the Master in Fine Arts in stage direction programme at Boston University in America and has published academic articles on the practice of applied theatre. She has worked closely with the English playwright Edward Bond, from whom she commissioned the play "The Children", directing its first performance in 2000. She has also worked with English writers Mike Kenny and Robin French and American playwright Deborah Lake Fortson. Bryanston has also been commissioned to direct productions by the Coventry Belgrade Theatre which is well known for developing the practice of theatre in education, and in the community.

Bryanston's stage direction has been described as "visually incisive" by The Sunday Times and "extraordinary and impressive" by The Guardian.
