= Bingo (play) =

1973 play by Edward Bond

Bingo:Scenes of Money and Death
- Programme Royal Court Theatre, 1974
- Original language: English
- Written by: Edward Bond
- Characters: William Shakespeare; Old Man; Old Woman; Judith; William Combe; Young Woman; Son; Ben Jonson; Wally; Joan; Jerome; 2nd Old Woman
- Subject: Politics, Money, Role of the Artist
- Genre: Political drama
- Setting: Warwickshire, 1615 and 1616

Premiere
- Date: 14 November 1973
- Place: Northcott Theatre, Devon

Bingo: Scenes of Money and Death is a 1973 play by English playwright Edward Bond. It depicts an ageing William Shakespeare at his Warwickshire home in 1615 and 1616, suffering pangs of conscience in part because he signed a contract which protected his landholdings, on the condition that he would not interfere with an enclosure of common lands that would hurt the local peasant farmers. Although the play is fictional, this contract has a factual basis. Bingo is a political drama heavily influenced by Bertolt Brecht and Epic theatre. Some have praised Bond's portrayal of Shakespeare while others have criticized it.

== Explanation of the title ==
In an interview with The Sunday Times, Bond commented: "Art has very practical consequences. Most 'cultural appreciation' ignores this and is no more relevant than a game of 'bingo' and less honest."

== Historical basis ==
Bond cites William Shakespeare by E.K. Chambers as his source for information about the Welcombe enclosure, on which Bingo is based. In the introduction to Bingo, Bond describes this incident: "A large part of his income came from rents (or tithes) paid on common fields at Welcombe near Stratford. Some important landowners wanted to enclose these fields... and there was a risk that the enclosure would affect Shakespeare's rents. He could either side with the landowners or with the poor who would lose their land and livelihood. He sided with the landowners. They gave him a guarantee against loss – and this is not a neutral document because it implies that should the people fighting the enclosers come to him for help he would refuse it. Well, the town did write to him for help and he did nothing."

== Characters ==
- William Shakespeare – Bond's Shakespeare is depressed and introspective, concerned more with financial security than with art or the people around him; he is notably silent during several scenes.
- Judith – Shakespeare's daughter; she resents Shakespeare's treatment of her mother
- William Combe – A wealthy landowner scheming to enclose the common lands for his own profit
- Old Man – Shakespeare's gardener, mentally handicapped after spending three years in a press gang
- Old Woman – The Old Man's wife, Shakespeare's housekeeper; Bond based her on Shakespeare's daughter Susanna Hall.
- Young Woman – A displaced beggar woman, prostitute, and pyromaniac
- Son of the Old Man and Woman, a religious zealot who leads a rebellion party against Combe
- Ben Jonson – Shakespeare's drinking buddy and theatrical rival
- Jerome, Wally, and Joan – Peasant workers who join the Son in fighting Combe
- 2nd Old Woman – Shakespeare's wife Anne Hathaway; she is heard but never seen on stage

== Plot ==
=== Part one ===
==== Scene 1 ====
Shakespeare is seated in his garden when the Young Woman arrives to beg. The Old Man takes her into the back garden for sex. The Old Woman tries to sound out Shakespeare's intentions with regards to Combe's land scheme and warns him that it will ruin local families. Combe arrives to convince Shakespeare to sign a contract stating that he will not interfere with the scheme, in exchange for the security of his own lands. Shakespeare hands Combe a paper stating his terms. The Old Man enters, followed by the Son, berating the Old Man for his sexual misconduct with the Young Woman. Combe interrogates her, but disbelieves her story, taking a haughty moralistic attitude. Combe and the Son take the Young Woman to be whipped for vagrancy and prostitution.

==== Scene 2 ====
Six months later. The Old Woman tells Judith about her husband's condition and his history with the press gang, but Judith takes a moralistic tone, condemning the Old Man for his infidelity and irresponsibility. Later, Shakespeare and the Old Man are in the garden when the Young Woman returns. She is physically decimated, having been living in burned out barns all winter, supported by the Old Man. Shakespeare tells Judith to give the woman food and clothing, but Judith resents her and refuses. The woman hides in the orchard when Combe arrives to give Shakespeare the contract, which he signs. Judith enters and tells Combe that the woman has returned; he sends his men to apprehend her. Judith berates her father for his toleration of their misconduct and his lack of sympathy with the local people: "You don't notice these things. You must learn that people have feelings. They suffer." Judith soon feels guilty at being the cause of the woman's punishment, and regrets turning her in. The Old Man breaks down crying because he knows that the woman will be executed for arson, having burned down several barns. He describes the public spectacle of an execution as a festivity he used to enjoy, but can no longer endure.

==== Scene 3 ====
The Young Woman has been executed, and hangs on a gibbet on stage. While Shakespeare sits alone, the Son and several local labourers eat lunch. The Son talks about the woman's sin, also making pointed comments about Shakespeare. The Son and his friend Wally look into the dead woman's face and engage in vehement prayer, jumping and shouting. When they leave, Shakespeare tells Judith about the violent scene of a bear-baiting that took place next to the theatre, saying "When I go to my theatre I walk under sixteen severed heads on a gate. You hear bears in the pit while my characters talk." Shakespeare relates his despair: "What does it cost to stay alive? I'm stupified by the suffering I've seen."

=== Part two ===
==== Scene 4 ====
Shakespeare and Ben Jonson are drinking in a tavern. Jonson has come to tell Shakespeare that the Globe Theatre has burned down, and to ask Shakespeare what he is writing. Their conversation and their attitude towards literature are unglamorous: "I hate writing. Fat white fingers excreting dirty black ink. Smudges. Shadows. Shit. Silence" Jonson says. Jonson recounts a life of violence, compared with Shakespeare's "serene" existence. As the two get increasingly inebriated, the Son and the workers enter, having just had an encounter with Combe's men while destroying Combe's ditches and fences. They see themselves as religious soldiers against the "rich thieves plunderin' the earth." Combe confronts them, claiming that he represents progress and realism.

==== Scene 5 ====
Shakespeare is walking home from the tavern through the fresh snow, coming across the Old Man, who is throwing snowballs. Judith enters and scolds Shakespeare; Shakespeare tells her that after temporarily abandoning her mother, he tried to love Judith with money, but ended up making her materialistic and vulgar. She leaves him, and as he sits alone in the snow, several dark figures run by backstage, and a gunshot is heard. The Old Woman comes to bring Shakespeare home.

==== Scene 6 ====
Shakespeare is in bed, half delirious, repeating the phrase "Was anything done?" Judith and her mother knock on the door calling for Shakespeare to let them in, gradually becoming hysterical when he does not respond, until finally he slips his will to them under the door and they leave. The Son enters, and tells Shakespeare that in a scuffle with Combe's men he shot his father, the Old Man. Combe enters, and the Son hypocritically accuses him of shooting the Old Man. While Combe and the Son argue, Shakespeare takes poison pills he had taken from Jonson. Combe and the Son leave, unaware that Shakespeare is dying. Judith enters, and paying no care to her dying father, she ransacks the room looking for money or a second will.

== Production history ==
Bingo was first presented at the Northcott Theatre, Devon on 14 November 1973. It was directed by Jane Howell and John Dove, with the following cast:

- Shakespeare – Bob Peck
- Old Man – Paul Jesson
- Son – David Howey
- William Combe – David Roper
- Ben Jonson – Rhys McConnochie
- Old Woman – Joanna Tope
- Judith – Sue Cox
- Young Woman – Yvonne Edgell

The play opened at the Royal Court Theatre on 14 August 1974, again directed by Jane Howell and John Dove; this time with John Gielgud (Shakespeare), John Barrett (Old man), Gillian Martell (Judith) and Arthur Lowe (Ben Jonson). There were queues at the box office to see Sir John; and The New York Times praised his performance and director Howell's "clean, lucid sense of line," adding, "The text is as uncompromising as anything Bond has written, and its performance serves it as sparely and unshowily as a dedicated string quartet addressing itself to Bach or late Beethoven."

The play's American Premiere occurred in January 1976 at the Yale Rep. Appearing in rotating repertory, the play had a limited run. Shakespeare was portrayed by Alvin Epstein.

The play was revived by the RSC, opening on 25 July 1995 at Stratford's Swan Theatre, directed by David Thacker, with Paul Jesson (Shakespeare), Ken Farrington (Old man), Sarah-Jane Holm (Judith) and Dominic Letts (Ben Jonson). The production played in repertory and on tour with The Tempest. According to Edward Bond, "the critic's notices were bad...I haven't seen it."

It was revived again at the Young Vic Theatre, opening on 16 Feb 2012, directed by Angus Jackson, with a cast led by Patrick Stewart (Shakespeare), John McEnery (Old Man), Catherine Cusack (Judith) and Richard McCabe (Ben Jonson). Bond, regarded by the directorial establishment as a difficult personality, claimed he was "banned from the rehearsal room" during production. The production, according to Michael Billington in The Guardian, "confirms Bond's 1973 play has achieved the status of a modern classic." Neil Dowden of Exeunt also praised McCabe's Ben Jonson as "scene-stealing [...] full of entertaining candour and self-loathing wit".

== Bond's Introduction ==
Like George Bernard Shaw, Bond generally wrote lengthy prose introductions for his plays. Bond begins the introduction to Bingo by mentioning the minor historical inaccuracies he introduced into the play for dramatic purposes; for example, the Globe Theatre burned down in 1613 rather than in 1616, and Michael Drayton was also present at Shakespeare's "last binge." The rest of the introduction explains Bond's view of the relationship between "human values," society, and art. Although he finds much suffering and violence in his own and in Shakespeare's time, Bond is not ultimately pessimistic; he attributes this violence not to human nature but to the arrangement of society, which can be reformed. Reflecting his Marxist views, Bond argues that the demands of capitalism force people to act in aggressive, self-interested ways that conflict with their innate human values: "We're wrong when we assume we're free to use money in human ways," Bond writes. He then argues that the proper role of art is to work against this corrupted version of society: "(Art) always insists on the truth, and tries to express the justice and order that are necessary to sanity but are usually destroyed by society." Shakespeare's dilemma in Bingo is that he is caught between his financially motivated behaviour and his artistic sensibility of the destructiveness of that behaviour: "Shakespeare's plays show this need for sanity and its political expression, justice. But how did he live? His behavior as a property-owner made him closer to Goneril than Lear. He supported and benefited from the Goneril-society – with its prisons, workhouses, whipping, starvation, mutilation, pulpit-hysteria and all the rest of it."

== Reception ==
Bingo has had a mixed reception from critics. After the November 1973 premiere at the Northcott Theatre, some wrote favorably about the play while others felt Bond had denigrated Shakespeare.

In 1974, Ronald Bryden of The New York Times billed Bingo as "a passionately cold, powerfully unforgiving play" from the "Royal Court's most important playwright". The Austin Chronicle's Barry Pineo described Shakespeare as the play’s least engaging character but wrote, "While this diminishes the impact of Bond's play, it does not eclipse it. Rarely have I encountered a playwright with a more clear social conscience, and rarely one who could express it with such visceral impact. Bingo is a lucid indictment of any society that puts monetary values over human values." In a review of the 2010 revival by Angus Jackson, The Guardian's Michael Billington said that "Bond's portrait of Shakespeare as a guilt-ridden figure, haunted by memories of the cruelty and injustice of his society, is moving and plausible. But Billington criticized "Bond's implicit suggestion that art is impotent in the face of violence and suffering [...] while plays may not overturn the social order, they can both reflect and unsettle it."

In 2011, M. Ramana Raju and V. Ravi Naidu declared, "This play [...] can be considered to be an eye-opener to all the people of the society regarding inhumanity and injustice which are becoming dominant." It was described in The Stage as "a trenchant portrait of an artist in his domestic and political setting". Neil Norman of Daily Express praised the scene in which Ben Jonson gets drunk with Shakespeare as funny, and also argued that "the penultimate scenes in a snow-covered field offer a moving metaphor for the impermanence of life itself as Stewart rolls around like a wounded bear, torn apart by his own guilt." In another review of a 2012 performance at Young Vic, Billington dubbed Bingo a "bony masterpiece" and described the work as "a guilt-ridden indictment of all poets and dramatists, himself included, for their exploitation of suffering and cruelty." The critic lauded Bond as having "extraordinary poetic economy". Mark Lawson said in 2016 that out of the few writers who had created Shakespeare bio-dramas, Bond "finds the most convincing voice for Shakespeare. Speaking a recognisable modern English in contrast to the phonetically presented Warwickshire dialect of the locals, the dying writer is given bleak, Lear-like prose, as when snowfall makes him reflect". Donald Clarke of The Irish Times called it a "fine play" in a 2019 review of a film about Shakespeare.

Other critics dismissed the play. In 1994, Lawrence Bommer of Chicago Reader panned Bond as "a rigid, humorless ideologue. Though William Shakespeare wrote plays more powerful than life, Bond naively expects the man to be as complete as his creations--as compassionate as Prospero, as furious at hypocrisy as Hamlet, as enraged at poverty as broken Lear. [...] And no antagonist offers an alternative to the bard's enervation". The same year, Chicago Tribune's Richard Christensen argued, "This state of a slow wasting away may be, as Bond states in a preface to his play, the only logical conclusion one can come to on the dying and death of Shakespeare if one examines the known facts about his closing years. But, though this may make the playwright's premise authentic, it unfortunately does not make his play engaging." In 2010, Karen Fricker wrote that Patrick Stewart's performance "cannot liven up the play’s heavy-handed politics and lack of compelling action. [...] That not much important action takes place on stage may be part of his point, but adds to the feeling this is more of a lesson than a drama."

A reviewer in the Evening Standard argued that "Bond's lugubrious, monotonous writing transforms the potent subject matter into something wearingly reductive. [...] Bond's tone and range is limited". Ismene Brown of The Arts Desk wrote, "It's a damn good set-up, not nice but plausible – still I’m not sure that this really adds up to a play about characters who change, rather than a tiptilted hommage. [...] Bond guns the social issues, but stumbles over the necessary language to make these ancillary characters sparkle – they prate, they strike attitudes (proto-feminism, proto-socialism), they’re even boring." The Daily Telegraph's Charles Spencer panned the work as a "priggish and schematic play". In the same paper, Tim Walker lauded Richard McCabe's performance as Ben Jonson but referred to the play itself as "very boring". Walker said Stewart "makes the best of what is a rather unappealing part [and] little more than a vehicle for a rather minor writer to attempt to score points against an incomparably greater one." According to Belinda Liversedge of Londonist, "the ideas somehow don't translate into magic on stage. [...] His indirect involvement to the tragedies seems too flimsy evidence to pin any guilt on him or explain his anguish." She also criticized Judith as "a rather lifeless character and that's nothing to do with Catherine Cusack's performance."
