= Buffalo Rising =

Newspaper in Buffalo, New York

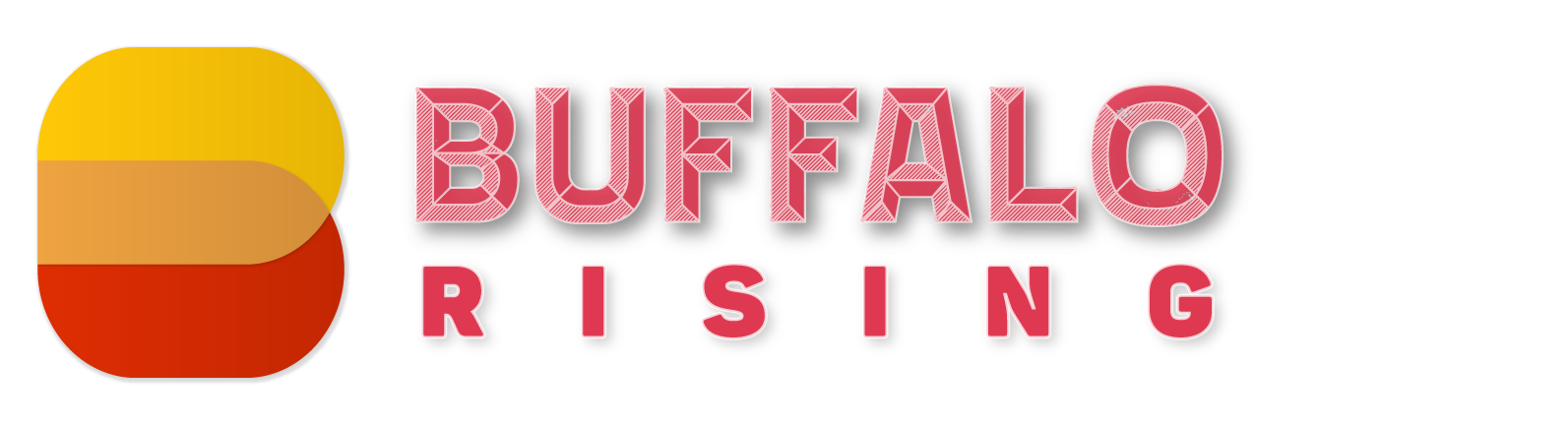
- Type: Online magazine
- Format: Tabloid
- Founder: Newell Nussbaumer
- Founded: 2003; 23 years ago
- Headquarters: Buffalo, NY
- Website: buffalorising.com

Buffalo Rising is an online magazine founded by Newell Nussbaumer in 2003 as a way to cover grassroots movements, Urban planning and development, and activism in Buffalo, New York. The format was originally a tri-annual and later a monthly printed paper with a small online blog to supplement it. The online blog quickly gained popularity, and in 2004 Buffalo Rising Online was launched. The magazine was originally a monthly print newspaper which now publishes exclusively online. The focus of the website continues to be on hyperlocal immersion journalism, with the writers actively participating in the activities they're writing about.

Buffalo Rising reaches an average of 50,000 unique readers and 503,000 page views per month.
