= William Gaskill =

British theatre director (1930–2016)

William "Bill" Gaskill (24 June 1930 – 4 February 2016) was a British theatre director who was "instrumental in creating a new sense of realism in the theatre". Described as "a champion of new writing", he was also noted for his productions of Bertolt Brecht and Restoration comedy.

== Biography ==
Born in Shipley, West Yorkshire, Gaskill was educated at Salt High School, Shipley, where he ran an amateur theatre with Tony Richardson. He won a scholarship to attend Hertford College at Oxford University, where he began directing, and he subsequently studied in Paris with Étienne Decroux.

He received a nomination for the Tony Award for Best Director in 1959 for his direction of Epitaph for George Dillon on Broadway.

Gaskill worked alongside Laurence Olivier as a founding director of the National Theatre from its time at the Old Vic in 1963. In 1962, he directed Vanessa Redgrave and Eric Porter in Cymbeline for the Royal Shakespeare Company.

He was the artistic director of the Royal Court Theatre between 1965 and 1972, where he directed premieres of plays by writers including David Hare, John Arden, Edward Bond and Arnold Wesker, as well as introducing many of Bertolt Brecht's works to British audiences.

In 1974, he co-founded the Joint Stock Theatre Company with Max Stafford-Clark, David Hare and David Aukin.

Gaskill was an associate member of the Royal Academy of Dramatic Art.

National Life Stories conducted an oral history interview (C1316/06) with William Gaskill in 2008, for its The Legacy of the English Stage Company collection held by the British Library.

== Bibliography ==
- Gaskill, W. (1990), A Sense of Direction, Limelight Editions, ISBN 0-87910-134-2
