= Saved (play) =

Play written by Edward Bond

- Original language: English
- Written by: Edward Bond
- Characters: Len; Pam; Fred; Harry; Mary; Pete; Colin; Mike; Barry; Liz
- Genre: Drama
- Setting: 1960s London

Premiere
- Date: 3 November 1965
- Place: England

Saved is a play by Edward Bond which premiered at the Royal Court Theatre, London, in November 1965.

The play itself is set in London during the 1960s. Its subject is the cultural poverty and frustration of a generation of young people on the dole and living on council estates. In response to the censorship of the play, Laurence Olivier wrote a letter to The Observer, saying that: "Saved is not a play for children but it is for grown-ups, and the grown-ups of this country should have the courage to look at it." American novelist Mary McCarthy praised its "remarkable delicacy".

The original cast included John Castle, Tony Selby, Ronald Pickup, Dennis Waterman, William Stewart, Barbara Ferris, Lucy Fleming, and Gwen Nelson. The creative team included director William Gaskill and lighting by Eric Baker.

== Controversy ==
Saved was originally refused a licence without severe cuts by the Lord Chamberlain. When it was performed to large private audiences, the Lord Chamberlain decided to prosecute those who were involved in the production of the play. Although the defendants pleaded guilty and were fined, the case reflected badly on the censorship office and was pivotal in the abolition of theatre censorship a few years later in 1968. Benedict Nightingale stated in 2001 that initially, the play divided reviewers more than any play since Henrik Ibsen's Ghosts.

With regard to the depiction of violence in the play, particularly in Scene Six, Bond emphasised in an "Author's Note: On Violence" for the first Bond volume (of three) in Methuen's The Master Playwrights series that "we have to put anything into its social context before we can say it has caused violence" and claimed that "whenever there is serious and constant violence, that is a sign of the presence of some major social injustice". As to the nature of that social injustice, the play remains rather vague, but Bond points to the idea that "the young murderers in Saved belong to this group" of people who "may merely react violently because of an unconscious motive, an unidentified discontent". He contends that "[s]ome of their cries while they murder the baby are ruling-class slogans", of which "racialism" is his prime example. In the play, Colin says about the baby that it "[l]ooks like a yeller-nigger", to which Bary replies: "'Onk like a yid" (Bond 1966, p. 68).

== Productions ==
In February 1969, after the abolition of censorship in the 1968 Theatres Act, Saved was given its first full public run at the Royal Court Theatre in London. The revival cast included: Malcolm Tierney (as Len), Kenneth Cranham (as Fred), Patricia Franklin (as Pam), Queenie Watts (as Mary), Tom Chadbon, Peter Blythe, and John Barrett. William Gaskill was the director. While critical reception initially was very negative, critics praised the play after the 1969 performance.

The play is rarely revived, though it has been described as "one of the great modern plays" and its theme of social disenfranchisement is seen by Bond as very relevant to the present day. The play would have to wait until 1984 before being revived in London, once again at the Royal Court. In October 2011, the play was revived in London for the first time in 27 years, at the Lyric Hammersmith, directed by Sean Holmes.

== Story ==
Pam, a young London woman, brings Len, a young London man, back to her house. They eat sweets. When Pam's father Harry passes, Len and Pam offer Harry candy laced with innuendo. Pam is amused by Len's behaviour. This scene ends with the intimation that Pam and Len are having sex. Len and Pam go boating on a lake in a local park. Pam is showing signs of being bored with Len. In charge of the boats is Fred, a friend of Len's. He shows interest in Pam.

Len becomes a lodger in Pam's house, although Pam has now left him for Fred. Fred does not treat her well, and Len is sympathetic. Pam is grateful for the sympathy, although she finds Len irritating. Pam becomes pregnant by Fred, and has his baby. Pam's mother Mary becomes fond of Len, although Pam gets increasingly annoyed by his presence in the house. Over the course of one scene, Pam fights with Len and with her mother Mary while the neglected baby cries continually. When Len suggests that something needs to be done about caring for the baby, Pam responds "Put it on the council", i.e. hand it over to child welfare authorities.

Fred goes fishing, watched by Len. Fred confides in Len that he is disenchanted with Pam. Fred and Len's friends Pete, Colin, Mike and Barry turn up, as does Pam, who is wheeling the baby in a pram. Not wanting to be left in charge of the baby, Fred loses his temper with Pam, who in turn becomes angry and leaves the baby with him. Len leaves. Pete, Colin, Mike and Barry tease the baby, at first harmlessly then with increasing roughness. Fred does nothing to stop them. Barry observes that babies are only animals that don't feel pain. When the baby dirties its nappy, they rub its face in the mess. The violence escalates as they strike the baby and ultimately throw stones at it, Fred joining in. The park is about to close and they run off, Fred returning only to fetch his fishing tackle. Pam returns to retrieve the baby and talks to it absently, not having noticed that it has been stoned to death. Still oblivious, she wheels it away.

Fred is sent to prison for his part in the baby's death, but far from accepting responsibility he is chiefly outraged at the way the crowd outside the prison was treating him. Len admits to him that he saw them attack the baby, but didn't intervene. Fred's response is that that will not help his case. He has finally finished with Pam. Len is still lodging with Pam and her parents. Pam is hoping that Fred will get back together with her when he is released from prison. Len feels a sexual attraction to Mary, Pam's mother, and flirts with her; she is flattered, but doesn't act on it.

Pam and Len go to a coffee bar, where Fred will come to celebrate his release. Fred, Colin, Pete, Mike, Barry and Fred's new girlfriend Liz turn up. Although Fred is glad to have been released he is edgy and tense, and is disgruntled to notice that Pam is there. When Pam confronts him and asks for him back, he explodes and calls her a "bloody menace", before leaving in disgust. The others follow, except for Len. Pam finally realises that Fred does not love her, and Len offers himself as a substitute, although she does not respond.

Harry confronts Mary about flirting with Len. They argue, and she hits him on the head with a teapot. A chair is also broken. Len helps Harry fix himself up and Harry reveals that he does not bear Len a grudge. Harry tells Len that Len's problem is that he didn't get to fight in World War II : "Yer never got yer man", i.e. Len has never killed anyone in combat.

Len slowly and methodically repairs the broken chair while Harry does his football pools, Pam reads a magazine and Mary does housework. The scene contains only one line of dialogue, from Len to Pam: "Fetch me 'ammer." Although he ends up having to fetch the hammer himself, the family has not completely disintegrated.

Edward Bond described the end of the play as "almost irresponsibly optimistic".

== Sources ==
- Saved, by Edward Bond. London, Methuen, 1966.
- Plays: One. Saved, Early Morning, The Pope's Wedding, by Edward Bond. London: Methuen, 1977.
- At the Royal Court – 25 Years of the English Stage Company, by Richard Findlater (ed.). Ambergate: Amber lane Press, 1981.
- A Sense of Direction – Life at the Royal Court, by William Gaskill. London, Faber, 1988; pp 62–70.
- The Royal Court Theatre Inside Out, by Ruth Little and Emily McLaughlin. London, Oberon Books, 2007.
- Changing Stages: A view of British Theatre in the twentieth century, by Richard Eyre and Nicholas Wright. London, Bloomsbury, 2000.
- "Edward Bond, Saved, November 1965", by Samantha Ellis. The Guardian, 23 April 2003.
- "Acid tongue". Mark Ravenhill on fellow playwright, Edward Bond. The Guardian, 9 September 2006.
- 1965 Plays and Players / Theatre World reviews and pictures
