= Victoria Wicks =

British actress (born 1959)

- Born: Beverly Victoria Anne Wicks; 18 April 1959 (age 67); Chippenham, Wiltshire, England
- Education: Royal Welsh College of Music & Drama
- Occupation: Actress
- Known for: Drop the Dead Donkey; The Imitation Game
- Spouse: Peter Williams (m. 1984; div. 2004)
- Children: 1

Victoria Wicks (born 18 April 1959) is a British actress. She is known for her role as Sally Smedley in Channel 4's comedy series Drop the Dead Donkey (1990–1998), Mrs Gideon in The Mighty Boosh (2004), and the College Director in Skins (2007–08). Her film appearances include The Imitation Game (2014) and High-Rise (2015). She is an associate of Howard Barker's theatre company, The Wrestling School. She is the granddaughter of the writer H. E. Bates.

== Biography ==
=== Early life and education ===
Beverley Victoria Anne Wicks was born 18 April 1959 in Chippenham, Wiltshire, England, to Brian and Judith Wicks. Wicks's mother, Judith Bates, born 1933, was the second child of the writer H. E. Bates. Wicks is the niece of Jonathan Bates, a sound editor who died in 2008, and the television producer Richard Bates, who produced the television adaptation of The Darling Buds of May. Wicks is a director of Evensford Productions Ltd, the company set up in 1955 to protect and promote H. E. Bates's work.

Wicks trained at the Royal Welsh College of Music & Drama where she was awarded the Pernod and Bisquit Award for the most promising graduate.

=== Career ===
Her first job was as acting assistant stage manager at Northampton Rep for a year, before going to Bristol Old Vic, Regent's Park and then the RSC. In 1988 Wicks was in Andy Hamilton's black comedy Tickets for the Titanic, and then went on to play Sally Smedley in all six series of Drop the Dead Donkey. The Mighty Boosh (a radio, television and stage show created by Noel Fielding and Julian Barratt) featured her in Series 1 as Mrs Gideon, the Head of Reptiles at the Zooniverse. Wicks also played Harriet Lawes, the Head of College in the first three series of Skins.

Wicks joined 'The Wrestling School' in 1996. The company was formed in 1988 for the sole purpose of performing the work of the dramatist Howard Barker. Since joining the company Wicks has appeared in nine plays by Barker, performing in London, Berlin, Stockholm, Copenhagen, Adelaide and also in Rouen, Grenoble, Le Mans and Paris for the co-production of Les Animaux en Paradis, which was performed in French by four British and five French actors. Wicks is an associate of The Wrestling School. In 2010 Wicks was invited to the Segal Theatre Center in New York as guest of Theatre Minima to celebrate a day-long event on the work of Howard Barker.

Wicks played the high priestess of the Sybillines in The Fires of Pompeii, a 2008 episode of Doctor Who. In 2014, she played Dorothy Clarke in The Imitation Game and Susannah Marshall in the E4 drama Glue (2014).

=== Personal life ===
In 1984 Wicks married Peter Williams (divorced 2004); they have one daughter.

== Credits ==
=== Work for Howard Barker ===
Year	Title	Role	Notes
1996	Uncle Vanya	Helena	London, Berlin, Stockholm
1998	Ursula; Fear of the Estuary	Mother Placida	London, Birmingham, Copenhagen
1999	Scenes From an Execution	Rivera	BITE Festival, Barbican Theatre (London)
2000	The Ecstatic Bible	Mrs Golllancz	Adelaide Theatre Festival (Australia)
2000	He Stumbled	Turner, The Queen	Riverside Studios (London) and Samuel Beckett Theatre (Dublin)
2001	The Swing at Night	Klatura	Marionette Theatre for Puppet Theatre Barge
2002	Gertrude – The Cry	Gertrude	Elsinore Castle (Denmark), Birmingham Rep and Riverside Studios (London)
2003	13 Objects	Cruel Cup, Kind Saucer, The Ring, Blue Shoe, The Drum	Birmingham Rep, Everyman Theatre (Liverpool) and Riverside Studios (London)
2005	The Fence in Its Thousandth Year	Algeria	Birmingham Rep, Oxford Playhouse, York Theatre Royal
2005	Les Animaux en Paradis	Tenna	Théâtre des Deux Rives (Rouen), Paris, Grenoble and Le Mans
2008	I Saw Myself		Premiere reading New End Theatre, Hampstead
Unknown	Actress With an Unloved Child		Premiere reading at Lewis Festival
Unknown	Screaming in Advance		Premiere readings of Concentration and Dying in the Street at The Print Room (London)
2010	Smack Me	Thing, A Searcher	Premiere reading at the Purcell Room, Southbank Centre (London)
1997	The Love of a Good Man	Mrs Sylvia Toynbee	BBC R3 Drama
1999	A House of Correction	Lyndsay	BBC R3 Drama
2001	Knowledge and a Girl	The Queen	BBC R4 Drama

=== Television ===
Year	Title	Role	Notes
1984	Prisoner of Zenda	Princess Flavia	episodes: 1-6
1985	Adultery: My Little Grey Home in the West	Janet	Ch4
1986	Two of Us	Jackie	
1987	Rumpole of the Bailey	Amanda Gleason	episode: "Rumpole and the Old, Old, Story"
1987	The Houseman's Tale	Allison Quothquan	episodes: 1-2
1987	Hold the Dream	Sarah Lowther	episode: 1
1988	Tickets for the Titanic	Arbuthnot	episode: "Pastoral Care"
1988	Gems	Elinor Whiteside	episodes: 3.25, 3.26, 3.27
1989	Storyboard	Virginia	episode: "Snakes & Ladders"
1989	Snakes & Ladders	Hotel receptionist	episodes: 2 & 4
1990	Grange Hill	Doctor Burton	episode: 13.17
1990	Not a Penny More, Not a Penny Less	Georgina Oakley	TV movie
1990	Drop the Dead Donkey	Sally Smedley	Ch4
1991	Amnesty International's Big 30	As Sally Smedley	
1993	Paul Merton: The Series	Emily	episode: 2.3
1993	Blossom	Jacqueline Renaud	episode: 4.2 & 4.4 (Blossom in Paris)
1993	Comic Timing	Sarah St. John Walderbury	episode: "No Worries"
1993	Prince Cinders	Princess Lovelypenny (voice)	Animation
1993	The Main Event	As herself	BBC game show
1994	Children in Need	As herself	BBC
1994	You Bet	As herself	ITV game show ep: 7.13
1994	Murder Most Horrid	Jocasta	episode: "We all hate Granny"
1994	Mud	Miss Palmer	
1995	Smith and Jones		episode: 8.3 & 8.6
1995	The Imaginatively Titled Punt & Dennis Show		episode: 2.2
1995	Stick with Me Kid	Christina Samone	
1996	Delta Wave	Olga Crick	
1996	Testament: The Bible in Animation	Jezebel (voice)	episode: Elijah
1997	Bright Hair (About the Bone)	Miss Montrose	TV movie
1997	Snap	Jane Taylor	
1998	Late Lunch with Mel and Sue	As herself	Ch4 ep: 2.3
2001	Peak Practice	Judy	episode: 12.3
2001	Bernard's Watch	Aunt Rowena	CITV
2002	Casualty	Connolly QC	
2002, 2007, 2009, 2011–2012, 2015, 2022	Doctors	Alison Matthews, Marjorie Middleton, Yvonne Diamond, Jenny Rockman, Jocasta Rathbone, Elspeth Manners, Jenny Nicholson	7 episodes
2002	My Family	Bex's Mother	Also in 2003, 2005
2004	The Brief	Magistrate	episode: "So Long, Samanatha"
2004	The Mighty Boosh	Mrs. Gideon	BBC 3
2004	Midsomer murders	Helen Callaghan	episode: "Sins of Commission"
2006	Comedy Connections	As herself	
2007	M.I. High	Head of MI8/MI9	
2007	My Family	Dinner Guest	
2007	Skins	Head of College (Harriet)	E4
2008	Midsomer murders	Sarah Stone	episode: 18.6 "Talking to the Dead"
2008	The Object	Burlap Mum	
2008	Mistresses	Gemma Grey	
2008	Doctor Who	High Priestess of The Sybillines	episode: "The Fires of Pompeii"
2009	No Signal		episode: 1.8 & 1.9 (You Me 'n' Him)
2009	Roar	Mother	
2009	Emmerdale	Mrs. Conway	episode: 1.5420
2009	Collision	Angela Reeves	episode: 1, 2 & 5
2009	Poirot	Mrs Swinburne	episode: "The Clocks"
2010	Sherlock	Margaret Patterson	episode: "A study in Pink"
2010	At Home with the Georgians / Behind Closed Doors	Lady Stanley	episode: "A Woman's Touch"
2011	EastEnders	Sandra Halliday	episode: 15 & 16 September
2012	Silent Witness	Lizzie Fraser	episode: "Death has no Dominion" parts I & II
2013	Wizards v Aliens	Chancellor Kooth	CBBC
2014	Glue	Susannah Marshall	E4
2014	Crackanory	Mrs. Murray, Head teacher	episode: 2.4 (Self Storage & the Obituary Writer)
2016	Sliding	Bronwen	
2017	Finding your Feet	Pru - Swimmer	
2018	The Royals	Ingrid	episode: "Confess Yourself to Heaven"
2019	Welcome to the Powder Keg	Lois	
2019	Mary in the Mirror	Therapist	
2021	The Larkins (2021 TV series)	Mrs Fothergill	Also credited as SCRIPT EDITOR
Unknown	The Ward	Barbara	
Unknown	No Worries	Sarah	
Unknown	Streetwise	Mrs Daniels	

=== Film ===
Year	Title	Role	Notes
1986	Ping Pong	Maggie Wong	Alan's wife
1990	Strike It Rich	Jane Truefit	
2003	What A Girl Wants	Henry's Secretary (Caroline)	
2014	The Imitation Game	Dorothy Clarke	Joan's mother
2015	High Rise	Miriam	
2015	Notes on Blindness	Sally (Librarian)	
2016	The Brother	Vendor	

=== Theatre ===
Year	Title	Role	Notes
1980	Quartet to Murder		Theatre Royal, Northampton
1980	Mother Goose		Theatre Royal, Northampton
1981	Whose Life is it Anyway?		Theatre Royal, Northampton
1981	Cinderella		Bristol Old Vic
1981	The Resistible Rise of Arturo Ui		Bristol Old Vic
1981	The Country Wife	Mistress Squeamish	Bristol Old Vic
1982	Taming of the Shrew	A Haberdasher	Regents Park Open Air Theatre
1982	A Midsummer Night's Dream	Helena	Regents Park Open Air Theatre
1983	From War to War with Love		New End Theatre, Hampstead
1983	Twelfth Night	Olivia	Royal Shakespeare Company
1983	Julius Caesar	Portia	Royal Shakespeare Company
1983	Measure for Measure		Royal Shakespeare Company
1983	A New Way to Pay Old Debts	Waiting Woman	Royal Shakespeare Company
1984	Space Invaders	Shar	Royal Shakespeare Company
1985	Chinamen	Jo, Bee, and Alex	Latchmere, Battersea
1986	Charley's Aunt	Amy Spettigue	Theatre Royal, Plymouth
1992	As You Like It	Rosalind	Ludlow Festival
1993	Blithe Spirit	Elvira	Cheltenham Everyman Theatre
1994	Dilemma for Murder		Watermill Theatre, Bagnor
1995	Mind the Gap by Meredith Oakes	Ginny	Hampstead Theatre
2006	A Woman of No Importance	Rachel Arbuthnot	Salisbury Playhouse
2008	Quartermaine's Terms	Melanie Garth	Touring production. Kenwright
2015	The One that Got Away	Madame Latour	Theatre Royal, Bath
Unknown	As You Like It	Hymen	
2024	Drop the Dead Donkey - Revisited	Sally Smedley	National tour - multiple venues

=== Radio ===
Year	Title	Role	Notes
Unknown	Anything Legal	Doreen	By Wally K. Daly
1982	The Cask of Amontillado	First Lady	(BBC R4) By Nick Fisher
1982	It's Disgusting at Your Age	Penny	(BBC R4) By Jacqueline Wilson
1982	Get Together	Susy	(BBC R4) By Barbara Clegg
1983	The Cleverest Man at Oxford	Gillian	(BBC R4) By Geoffrey Parkinson
1984	Riding to Jerusalem	Amelia Man	(BBC R4) By Elspeth Sandys
1985	Albert's Extra Parliamentary Activities	Receptionist	(BBC R4) By Nick Fisher
1991	The Cabaret of Dr Caligari	Anthrax	(BBC R4) By Alan Gilbey
2000	The Secret Parts	Rosemary Malcolm	(BBC R4) Adapted by David Edgar
