= Cristian Taraborrelli =

Italian theatre, opera and cinema director

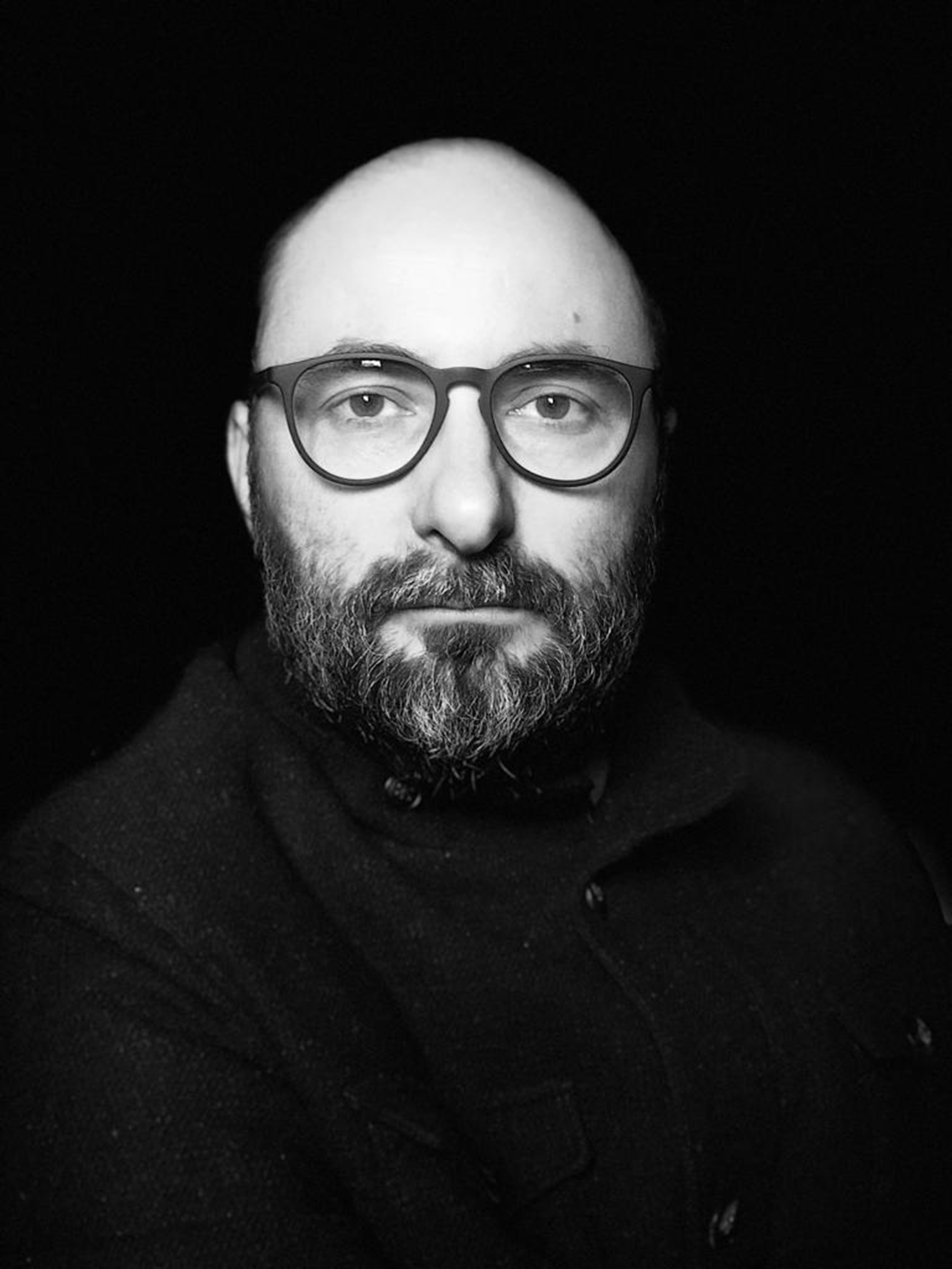
- Cristian Taraborrelli in 2023
- Born: 1970 (age 54–55); Rome, Italy
- Occupations: Opera and Show director; set designer; costume designer
- Awards: Prix du Syndicat de la critique for Gertrude – The Cry (2009)
- Website: www.cristiantaraborrellistudio.net

Cristian Taraborrelli (born 1970) is an Italian director specializing in theatre, opera, and cinema.

== Biography ==
Taraborrelli began his theatrical career in the early 1990s. He is a set designer, costume designer, and director, with a body of work spanning experimental theatre and opera.

His style is defined by a continuous exploration of balance within the instability and transformation of the theatrical machine, incorporating elements such as suspensions, reversals, doublings, deformations, disproportions, and framing.

Taraborrelli is renowned for his creative and innovative approach to set and costume design. He crafts visual worlds that closely interact with the music and text, imbuing them with new layers of meaning. His set designs often employ an abstract and metaphorical language to convey the emotions and themes of the work. Utilizing unconventional materials and advanced technological solutions, he creates setups that captivate and engage the audience.

In his costume designs, Taraborrelli strives for a balance between honoring tradition and embracing stylistic innovation. He reimagines the forms and symbols of the past through a contemporary lens, creating garments that not only define the characters but also express their psychology.

=== Early career as set designer ===
In the early 1990s, Taraborrelli collaborated with Giorgio Barberio Corsetti and Fabio Massimo Iaquone, engaging in experimental theatre projects.

Taraborrelli's authorial career became more distinct starting in 2006, as he gained greater freedom in directing and staging performances. In the same year, he was awarded the Franco Abbiati Prize by Italian music critics. In 2009, he received the Prix du Syndicat de la critique for Best Set Design for Gertrude - The Cry.

== 2000s ==
=== Career as opera director ===
In 2003, Taraborrelli made his debut as an opera director at the Pergolesi-Spontini Festival with Lalla Rukh ovvero Guancia di Tulipano. He continued his work in opera direction with notable productions such as La Jura (2015), Il colore del sole (2017), FRAM(M)ENTI (2018), La sonnambula (2019–2021), I pagliacci (2021), and Angelica Cunta (2021).

== Now ==
Taraborrelli's work, including the design of the Aquarium of Genoa and various installations over the past two decades, demonstrates a clear departure from both the physical and conceptual confines of traditional theatre.

=== Awards ===
- Ubu Prize
  - 1999 - Best play: Il processo by Giorgio Barberio Corsetti, from Franz Kafka, production by Teatro Stabile dell'Umbria - Teatro Biondo
- Prize Franco Abbiati della critica musicale italiana
  - 2003 for Il letto della storia by Fabio Vacchi—Best new Italian play
- Prix Molière
  - 2009 for Gertrude - The Cry - Théâtre de l'Odéon Paris
- Prix du Sindicat del acritique
  - 2009 Meilleurs créateurs d'eléments scéniques
- Golden Prague
  - 2015 Special Mention Awards, La Belle Hélène
- Best educational event
  - 2016 - Acquario Regeneration Bea Italia

=== Director ===
==== Opera ====
- Lalla Rûkh or Guancia di tulipano by Gaspare Spontini - Azio Corghi in Festival Pergolesi Spontini - Jesi (2003)
- La Jura by Gavino Gabriel Teatro Lirico di Cagliari Cagliari (2015)
- Il colore del sole by Lucio Gregoretti Festival Pergolesi Spontini - Jesi (2017)
- FRAM(M)ENTI by György Kurtág in Festival Nuova Consonanza - La pelanda Rome (2018)
- La sonnambula by Vincenzo Bellini in Teatro delle Muse – Ancona (2019–2021)
- I pagliacci by Ruggero Leoncavallo in Teatro Carlo Felice - Genoa (2021)
- Angelica Cunta by Virginia Guastella in Festival Nuova Consonanza – Pelanda Rome (2021)

=== Set decorator and costume designer ===
==== Lectuer ====
- Digital & interactive media design: The immaterial stage in Accademia di Belle Arti di Roma

==== Theatre ====
- Il corpo è una folla spaventata by Vladimir Mayakovsky in Rome (1996)
- La nascita della tragedia by Giorgio Barberio Corsetti Acquario Romano in Rome (1996)
- Notte by Giorgio Barberio Corsetti Teatro Valle in Rome (1998)
- Il processo by Giorgio Barberio Corsetti Ex mattatoio Rome (1998) -- winner of Ubu Awards
- Trilogía das Barcas by Gil Vicente TNSJ Porto (1999)
- La tempesta by Fromental Halévy from William Shakespeare in Festival d'Avignon (1999)
- Graal by Giorgio Barberio Corsetti Officine Molliconi Rome (2000)
- Woyzeck by Georg Büchner Venice Biennale (2001)
- Don Giovanni by Molière in National Theatre of Strasbourg (2002)
- Le metamorfosi by Ovid in Venice Biennale (2002)
- Iniziali: BCGLF by Giorgio Barberio Corsetti and Lindo Ferretti in Romaeuropa Festival, Rome (2003)
- Colore bianco by Giorgio Barberio Corsetti in Olimpiadi della cultura Turin (2006)
- La bottega del caffè by Carlo Goldoni in TNSJ Porto (2008)
- Tra la terra e il cielo by Giorgio Barberio Corsetti in Benevento Teatro Festival (2008)
- Gertrude – The Cry by Howard Barker in Théâtre de l'Odéon, Paris (2009)
- La Ronde du carré by Dimitris Dimitriadis in Théâtre de l'Odéon, Paris (2010)
- Can't Pay? Won't Pay! by Dario Fo in Comédie de Genève (2013)
- Ventrosoleil by Douna Loupin Am Stram Gram Théâtre Genève (2014)
- The Marriage of Figaro by Pierre-Augustin Caron de Beaumarchais in Comédie de Genève (2018)

==== Opera ====
- Biancaneve ovvero il perfido candore by Fabrizio De Rossi Re. Teatro Ghione in Rome (1993)
- Maria di Rohan by Gaetano Donizetti Teatro La Fenice in Venice (1999)
- La voix humaine by Francis Poulenc Teatro Massimo in Palermo (2000)
- Erwartung by Schönberg Teatro Massimo Vittorio Emanuele in Palermo (2000)
- La Cenerentola by Gioachino Rossini Teatro Marrucino in Chieti - Teatro dei Rinnovati in Siena (2000)
- Requiem per Edith Stein Teatro dell'Opera di Roma in Rome (2001)
- La bohème by Giacomo Puccini Teatro Vittorio Emanuele in Messina (2001)
- Milton and Julie by Gaspare Spontini Festival Pergolesi Spontini in Jesi (2001)
- Medea by Adriano Guarnieri Teatro La Fenice in Venice (2002)
- Il letto della storia by Fabio Vacchi in Teatro Comunale di Firenze (2003)
- Estaba la madre by Luis Bacalov Teatro dell'Opera di Roma (2004)
- Gesualdo Considered as Murderer by Luca Francesconi in Holland Festival Amsterdam (2004)
- Le luthier de Venice by Gualtiero Dazzi in Théâtre du Châtelet Paris (2004)
- Falstaff by Giuseppe Verdi in Strasbourg Opera House Strasbourg (2004)
- Candide by Leonard Bernstein in Opéra de Rennes (2004)
- Tosca by Giacomo Puccini in Maggio Musicale Fiorentino (2005)
- L'Orfeo by Monteverdi in Opéra de Lille (2005)
- La pietra del paragone by Gioachino Rossini in Teatro Regio di Parma Parma (2006)
- Marie Galante by Kurt Weill in Teatro dell'Opera di Roma Rome (2007)
- Y Borges cuenta que by Luis Bacalovin 65a Settimana Musicale Senese Siena (2008)
- Zelmira by Gioachino Rossini in Rossini Opera Festival XXX edizione Pesaro (2009)
- La Sonnambula by Vincenzo Bellini in Theater St. Gallen (2010)
- Turandot by Giacomo Puccini in Teatro alla Scala Milan (2011)
- La Rondine by Giacomo Puccini Teatro Vittorio Emanuele II Messina Messina (2012)
- Luisa Miller by Giuseppe Verdi Malmö Opera in Malmö, Sweden (2012)
- L'elisir d'amore by Gaetano Donizetti Opéra de Lausanne, Lausanne (2012)
- Don Carlos by Giuseppe Verdi Mariinsky Theatre in Saint Petersburg (2012)
- Macbeth by Giuseppe Verdi Teatro alla Scala in Milan (2013)
- La Sonnambula by Vincenzo Bellini Teatro Petruzzelli in Bari (2013)
- La pietra del paragone by Gioachino Rossini Théâtre du Châtelet in Paris, ripresa (2014)
- L'elisir d'amore by Gaetano Donizetti Opéra de Monte Carlo, ripresa (2014)

==== Film ====
- Laura non c'è director Antonio Bonifacio (1998)
- Il regalo di compleanno director Christian Bisceglia (2003)
- L'estate sta finendo - director Stefano Tummolini (2011)

==== Video ====
- La pietra del paragone by G. Rossini Ensemble Matheus Jean Christophe Spinosi
- Luisa Miller by Giuseppe Verdi in Malmö Symphony Orchestra
- Zelmira by Rossini in Rossini Opera Festival
- La Jura by Gavino Gabriel in Teatro Lirico di Cagliari
- L'elisir d'amore by Gaetano Donizetti in Opéra de Lausanne
