= Janet Henfrey =

English actress (born 1935)

- Born: 16 August 1935 (age 91); Aldershot, Hampshire, England
- Education: St Anne's College, Oxford; Smith College; Royal Academy of Dramatic Art
- Occupation: Actress
- Years active: 1962–present
- Known for: As Time Goes By

Janet Ethne Anne Henfrey (born 16 August 1935) is an English actress with a career spanning seven decades. She is a familiar face on stage and screen since the 1960s starring in a variety of British Television favourites. She is perhaps best known for playing Mrs. Bale on As Time Goes By, and for her role as the schoolteacher in the Dennis Potter television play Stand Up, Nigel Barton (1965) and Potter's serial The Singing Detective (1986), also as a schoolteacher.

== Early life ==
Before training at the Royal Academy of Dramatic Art she read English at St Anne's College, Oxford, and spent a graduate year at Smith College reading History.

== Credits ==
Other TV credits include: Victoria Wood: As Seen on TV (1985); As Time Goes By, The Jewel in the Crown; Reilly, Ace of Spies; Doctor Who (in the serial The Curse of Fenric and the episode "Mummy on the Orient Express"); Jeeves and Wooster; Casualty; Lovejoy; One Foot in the Grave; My Uncle Silas and Simon and the Witch. Henfrey also played a minor character in an episode of the 1996 series of The Famous Five, "Five Get into Trouble" and Mistress Hecate Broomhead in two episodes of The Worst Witch ("The Inspector Calls" and "Just Like Clockwork"). She appeared in the 2002 adaptation of the British miniseries Tipping The Velvet, based on the novel by Sarah Waters, playing Mrs Jex. She also appeared in the 2015 British miniseries adaptation of Wolf Hall.

== Personal life ==
Henfrey lives in Islington, north London. She is a member of the Labour Party and a trustee of the International Performers Aid Trust.

== Filmography ==
=== Film ===
Year	Title	Role	Notes
1963	It's All Happening	April	
1974	The Tamarind Seed	Embassy Section Head	
1981	Reds	Emma Goldman's Jail Guard	Uncredited
1983	Fanny Hill	Lady in Intelligence Office	Uncredited
1985	She'll Be Wearing Pink Pyjamas	Lucy	
1986	Lady Jane	Housekeeper	
1986	Foreign Body	Landlady	
1989	The Cook, The Thief, His Wife and Her Lover	Alice	
1990	The Fool	Unknown	
1994	Dragonworld	Miss Twittingham	
1994	A Pin for the Butterfly	Mrs. Veverka	
1997	Mrs Dalloway	Miss Pym	
1997	Amy Foster	Mrs. Rigby	
1997	The Man Who Knew Too Little	Ms. Goldstein	
1998	Les Misérables	Mme. Gilot	
1998	Ever After	Celeste	
1998	Jilting Joe	Miss Doughty	
1999	An Ideal Husband	Miss Prism	
2000	The Nine Lives of Tomas Katz	Janice Waily	
2001	Blow Dry	Aerobics Teacher	
2006	The Omen	Mrs. Horton	
2009	Season of Mists	Mary	
2009	National Theatre Live: All's Well That Ends Well	The Widow	
2012	Metamorphosis	The Cleaner	
2014	Mr. Turner	Janet	Uncredited
2015	London Road	Ivy	
2016	Pride and Prejudice and Zombies	Dowager	
2016	Bridget Jones's Baby	Mavis Enderbury	
2021	Cruella	Society Maven	
2022	Persuasion	Viscountess Lady Dalrymple	

==== Television ====
Year	Title	Role	Notes
1961	Comedy Matinee	Unknown	Episode: "Thark"
1964	Martin Chuzzlewit	Bridesmaid/Second Daughter	2 episodes
1964	Silas Marner	Miss Gunn	2 episodes
1965	A Tale of Two Cities	Mrs. Cruncher	2 episodes
1965	The Wednesday Play	Miss Tillings	Episode: "Stand Up, Nigel Barton"
1968	The Jazz Age	Frau Tonn	Episode: "Black Exchange"
1973	Wessex Tales	Mary	Episode: "Barbara of the House of Grebe"
1975	Churchill's People	Charlotte	Episode: "Silver Giant, Wooden Dwarf"
1981	Great Expectations	Camilla	Episode: "Episode Two: Part 1"
1981	Mark Gertler: An Autobiography	Lady Ottoline Morrell	Television film
1983	Jury	Miss Wood	Episode: "Julian"
1983	Reilly: Ace of Spies	Receptionist	Episode: "Shutdown"
1983	The Weather in the Streets	Lady Blanche	Television film
1984	The Jewel in the Crown	Edwina Crane	Episode: "Crossing the River"
1984	Chocky	Cranky Woman	Episode: "Episode #1.5"
1984-1992	Screen Two	Mlle. Debierre/Teacher	2 episodes
1985	Victoria Wood: As Seen on TV	Mrs Hennigan	Episode: "Episode #1.2"
1985	Honour, Profit & Pleasure	Hop-Pole	Television film
1985	Oliver Twist	Martha	3 episodes
1986	Alice in Wonderland	Queen of Hearts	2 episodes
1986	Henry's Leg	Mrs. Snell	Episode: "Episode #1.1"
1986	The Singing Detective	Schoolteacher	5 episodes
1987	Boon	University Registrar	Episode: "A Fistful of Pesetas"
1987-1988	Simon and the Witch	Tombola	6 episodes
1988	Mr. Majeika	Dilys Sherwood Greene	Episode: "He Came From Walpurgis" (uncredited)
1988	Wild Things	Sophie Buchanan	Television film
1989	Ticket to Ride	Olga	Episode: "A Horse is a Horse, Of Course, Of Course"
1989	Young Charlie Chaplin	Sister Mills	Episode: "Episode #1.6"
1989	Capstick's Law	Miss Price	Episode: "Episode #1.5"
1989	Doctor Who	Miss Hardaker	Serial: "The Curse of Fenric"
1990	The Inspector Alleyn Mysteries	Mrs. Hipkins	Episode: "Artists in Crime"
1991	The Upper Hand	Dorothy Cooper	Episode: "Common Entrance"
1991	Jeeves and Wooster	Miss Mapleton	Episode: "Wooster with a Wife (or, Jeeves the Matchmaker)"
1991	Casualty	Sister Joan	Episode: "Making the Break"
1991	Bernard and the Genie	Miss Purse	Television film
1992	Moon and Son	Madame Lefebre	Episode: "The Horns of Capricorn"
1992	Inmates	Unknown	Television film
1992	Crime Story	Kay Calhaem	Episode: "Deadly Obsession"
1993	One Foot in the Grave	Miss Lander	Episode: "Hearts of Darkness"
1993	Just a Gigolo	Cynthia	Episode: "Episode #1.6"
1993	Lovejoy	Miss Frobisher	Episode: "The Price of Fish"
1993-2005	As Time Goes By	Mrs. Bale	16 episodes
1994	Downwardly Mobile	Anna	Episode: "Grapefruit and Roses"
1995	Mike & Angelo	Mrs. Hardacre	Episode: "Mrs Shoutfire"
1995	The Famous Five	Aggie	Episode: "Five Get Into Trouble"
1996	Delta Wave	Receptionist	Episode: "The Light Fantastic: Part 2"
1996	No Bananas	Miss Cardew	6 episodes
1996	The Prince and the Pauper	Goody Watson	3 episodes
1996	The Moonstone	Mrs. Yolland	Television film
1996	The Treasure Seekers	Governess	Television film
1997	Cone Zone	Twigg	Episode: "High Flyer"
1997	Scene	Danusha	Episode: "Skinny Marink"
1997	Dual Balls	Unknown	Short film
1999	Doomwatch: Winter Angel	Julie	Television film
1999-2000	The Worst Witch	Miss Hecate Broomhead	2 episodes
2001	Attila the Hun	Palcharia	2 episodes
2001	Randall & Hopkirk (Deceased)	Hettie Craven	Episode: "Whatever Possessed You?"
2001	I Was a Rat	Mrs. Cribbins	3 episodes
2001	Mr. Thompson's Carnation	Miss Simmons	Short film
2001-2003	Uncle Silas	Aunt Tibby	2 episodes
2002	Tipping the Velvet	Mrs. Jex	2 episodes
2003	Dr. Jekyll and Mr. Hyde	Mrs. Robey	Television film
2004	The Basil Brush Show	Aunt Quartermass	Episode: "Basil's Christmas Turkey"
2009	Scouting for Rudeboys	Scout Leader	Short film
2010	Fairytale of London Town	Elsie Grindell	Television film
2010-2014	Doctors	Martha Bidwell/Poppy Heppel	2 episodes
2012	Our Life Together	Alice	Short film
2013	Quick Cuts	Customer	Episode: "Episode #1.3"
2013	Marple	Mrs. Lee	Episode: "Endless Night"
2014	Father Brown	Vera Thimble	Episode: "The Daughters of Jerusalem"
2014	Doctor Who	Mrs. Pitt	Episode: "Mummy on the Orient Express"
2014	Toast of London	Penny Traitor	Episode: "The Moose Trap"
2015	Wolf Hall	Lady Margaret Pole	2 episodes
2017	The Crown	Vita Sackville-West	Episode: "Vergangheit"
2018	Nutritiously Nicola	Therapist	2 episodes
2018	Dirty Little Rascals	Nan	Short film
2019	Sil and the Devil Seeds of Arodor	The Adjudicator	Television film
2019-2020	The New Pope	Lady Brannox	2 episodes
