= Jan Maxwell =

American actress (1956–2018)

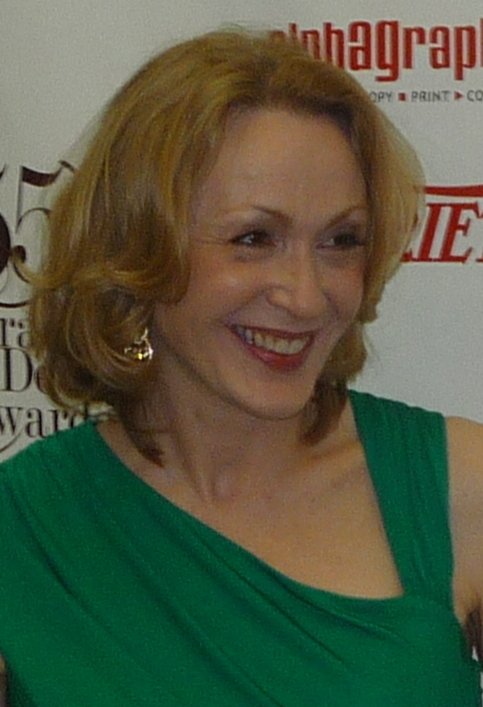
- Maxwell in 2010
- Born: Janice Elaine Maxwell; November 20, 1956; Fargo, North Dakota, U.S.
- Died: February 11, 2018 (aged 61); New York City, New York, U.S.
- Education: Moorhead State University
- Occupation: Actress
- Years active: 1989–2017
- Spouse: Robert Emmet Lunney
- Awards: Drama Desk Award (2005, 2010)

Janice Elaine Maxwell (November 20, 1956 – February 11, 2018) was an American stage and television actress. She was a five-time Tony Award nominee and two-time Drama Desk Award winner. In a career spanning over thirty years, Maxwell was one of the most celebrated and critically acclaimed stage actresses of her time.

Maxwell made her Broadway debut in 1989, as an understudy in the musical City of Angels. She received her first Tony nomination in 2005 for the musical Chitty Chitty Bang Bang. Her other nominations were for Coram Boy in 2007, Lend Me a Tenor and The Royal Family both in 2010, and Follies in 2012.

Her nominations in two separate Tony Award categories in 2010, made her only the fourth actress to achieve two nominations in a single year. Her 2012 nomination for Follies made her only the second actress to receive a Tony nomination in all four acting categories. Her other Broadway credits include Dancing at Lughnasa (1992), A Doll's House (1997), The Sound of Music (1998) and The Dinner Party (2001).

Maxwell appeared in films and television shows such as I Am Michael with James Franco, Neil LaBute's Billy and Billie (2014–15), The Divide (2014), The Good Wife (2014), and Gossip Girl (2009–2011). From 1994-2003, she appeared in four episodes of the NBC drama Law & Order, each time as a different character. She also appeared in season 3 of Madam Secretary in 2016.

== Early life and education ==
Maxwell was born in Fargo, North Dakota, as the fifth of six children to former First District Judge, Ralph B. Maxwell, who served in North Dakota from 1967 to 1978, and his wife, Elizabeth "Liz" Maxwell (née Fargusson; 1926–2015), later a lawyer for the EPA. She attended West Fargo High School, West Fargo, North Dakota, University of Utah, and Moorhead State University.

She played the lead role as Calamity Jane in her high school's 1973 production of Deadwood Dick.

== Career ==
Maxwell made her Broadway debut as an understudy in the Cy Coleman – David Zippel musical City of Angels in 1989. She eventually took over the dual roles of Carla Haywood and Alaura Kingsley.

She appeared in Brian Friel's Dancing at Lughnasa in 1992, which won the Tony Award for Best Play. She replaced original cast member Brid Brennan in the role of Agnes. In 1997, she appeared in A Doll's House opposite Janet McTeer. In 1998, she played Elsa Schraeder in the first Broadway revival of Rodgers and Hammerstein's The Sound of Music. She then starred opposite John Ritter and Henry Winkler in Neil Simon's The Dinner Party in 2000 and in Sixteen Wounded in 2004 with Judd Hirsch and Martha Plimpton. On television during this time, between 1994 and 2003, she made four guest appearances in the long-running NBC crime drama Law & Order, each time as a different character.

In 2005, she received a Tony Award nomination for Best Featured Actress in a Musical, for the role of Baroness Bomburst in the stage production of Chitty Chitty Bang Bang. She also won the Drama Desk Award for this role. In 2006, she starred in Roundabout Theatre Company's Off-Broadway revival of Joe Orton's Entertaining Mr. Sloane for which she received a Drama Desk nomination for Best Actress. Also in 2006, she reunited with her Sound of Music co-star Richard Chamberlain in Hawaii Opera Theatre's production of Rodgers and Hammerstein's The King and I in Honolulu, Hawaii. In 2007, she starred as Mrs. Lynch in the Broadway production of Helen Edmundson's Coram Boy at the Imperial Theatre, for which she received her second Tony Award nomination, for Best Featured Actress in a Play, as well as another Drama Desk Award nomination for Outstanding Featured Actress in a Play.

Her Off-Broadway and regional credits include performances in The Seagull at the John F. Kennedy Center for the Performing Arts in 1985, in House & Garden at the Manhattan Theatre Club in 2002, in A Bad Friend at the Newhouse Theater, Lincoln Center in 2003 and at Carnegie Hall in the Stephen Sondheim concert, Opening Doors, in 2004.

In 2008 she appeared Off-Broadway with the Potomac Theatre Project/NYC in Howard Barker's Scenes from an Execution and was nominated for a Drama Desk and NYITT award. In 2008, Maxwell appeared on Broadway in the Manhattan Theater Club production of To Be or Not to Be in the role of Maria Tura at the Friedman Theatre.

She appeared as Julie Cavendish in the Broadway revival of The Royal Family at the Samuel J. Friedman Theatre in late 2009. For this role she won the 2010 Drama Desk Award for Outstanding Actress in a Play. Maxwell starred as Maria in the Broadway revival of Lend Me a Tenor, which began performances at the Music Box Theatre on March 11, 2010.

She won the Outer Critics Circle Award as Outstanding Featured Actress in a Play for this role. Maxwell received two 2010 Tony Award nominations: one for her leading role in The Royal Family in 2009 and another for her featured role in Lend Me a Tenor in 2010. She is only the fourth actress to receive double nominations in a single year.

Maxwell played the role of Phyllis Rogers Stone in the Kennedy Center production of the Stephen Sondheim–James Goldman musical Follies, running from May 7 to June 19, 2011, at the Eisenhower Theater in Washington, DC. Her co-stars were Bernadette Peters, Elaine Paige, Ron Raines and Danny Burstein. She reprised her role in the Broadway limited engagement at the Marquis Theatre, which ran from August 7, 2011 (previews) through January 22, 2012. On October 29, 2011, after the Saturday matinee, Maxwell was hit by a minivan, suffering injuries to her arm and leg, fracturing her fibula. She missed the following two shows, but was back a few days later. Maxwell received Helen Hayes, Fred Astaire, Drama League, Outer Critics Circle, Drama Desk and Tony Award nominations for Best Leading Actress in a Musical for this role. The Tony nomination (her fifth) made her only the second actress to receive nominations in all four acting categories; the first was Angela Lansbury. Maxwell reprised her role in this production's transfer to the Ahmanson Theatre in Los Angeles, California from May 3 to June 9, 2012.

She appeared in the PTP/NYC (The Potomac Theatre Project) Off-Broadway production of the Howard Barker play Victory: Choices in Reaction, in a limited engagement in July 2011. In 2013, Maxwell played the role of Skinner in Howard Barker's The Castle: A Triumph with PTP/NYC at the Atlantic Theatre, Stage 2. She appeared in the Off-Broadway production of the Anthony Giardina play, The City of Conversation at the Lincoln Center Mitzi Newhouse Theater, from May 5, 2014, to July 26, 2014. She was nominated for the 2015 Lucille Lortel Award, Outstanding Actress in a Play, the 2015 Outer Critics Circle Award, Outstanding Actress in a Play, the 2015 Drama Desk Award, Best Actress in a Play and 2015 Drama League Award, Distinguished Performance Award. In an interview with Time Out New York in July 2016, Maxwell announced that she was retiring from theatre after the run of her second production of Scenes from an Execution then in rehearsal.

She was also a voice actress and read several audio books, including Mary Higgins Clark's Two Little Girls in Blue and No Place Like Home.

Maxwell starred as a "scheming Senator" in the CBS TV series BrainDead alongside Mary Elizabeth Winstead, Aaron Tveit and Tony Shalhoub, which aired from June to September 2016.

== Personal life and death ==
Maxwell was married to actor and playwright Robert Emmet Lunney, and they had a son William "Will" Maxwell-Lunney.

Maxwell died on February 11, 2018, from leptomeningeal carcinomatosis complicated from breast cancer at her Manhattan apartment at the age of 61.

== Acting credits ==
=== Theater ===
Year	Title	Role	Venue	Ref.
1981	Annie	Annette/Ronnie Boylan/Ensemble u/s Lily St. Regis	U.S. National Tour	
1985	The Seagull	Maid	Regional,The Kennedy Center	
1989	City of Angels	u/s Alaura Kingsley, Carla Haywood (replacement)	Broadway, Virginia Theatre	
1991	Dancing at Lughnasa	Agnes (replacement)	Broadway, Plymouth Theatre	
1991	Here's Love	Doris Walker	Regional, Goodspeed Musicals	
1994	Inside Out	Liz	Off-Broadway, Cherry Lane Theatre	
1995	The Professional	Martha	Off-Broadway, Circle Repertory Theater	
1997	A Doll's House	Kristine Linde	Broadway, Belasco Theatre	
1998	The Sound of Music	Elsa Schraeder	Broadway, Martin Beck Theatre	
2000	The Dinner Party	Mariette Levieux	Broadway, Music Box Theatre	
2002	House and Garden	Trish Platt	Off-Broadway,Manhattan Theatre Club	
2002	My Old Lady	Chloe Giffard	Off-Broadway, Promenade Theatre	
2003	A Bad Friend	Naomi	Off-Broadway, Mitzi E. Newhouse Theater	
2004	Sixteen Wounded	Sonya	Broadway, Walter Kerr Theatre	
2004	The Bald Soprano and The Lesson	Mrs. Smith	Off-Broadway, Linda Gross Theatre	
2005	Chitty Chitty Bang Bang	Baroness Bomburst	Broadway, Hilton Theatre	
2006	The King and I	Anna Leonowens	Regional, Hawaii Opera Theatre	
2006	Entertaining Mr. Sloane	Kath	Off-Broadway, Roundabout Theatre Company	
2007	Coram Boy	Mrs. Lynch	Broadway, Imperial Theatre	
2008	To Be or Not To Be	Maria	Broadway, Samuel J. Friedman Theatre	
2008	Substitution	Calvin’s Mom	Off-Broadway, Soho Playhouse	
2009	The Royal Family	Julie Cavendish	Broadway, Samuel J. Friedman Theatre	
2010	Lend Me a Tenor	Maria	Broadway, Music Box Theatre	
2010	Wings	Emily Stilson	Off-Broadway, Second Stage Theatre	
2011	Victory: Choices in Reaction	Bradshaw	Off-Broadway, Atlantic Stage 2	
2011	Follies	Phyllis Rogers Stone	Regional, Kennedy Center	
2011	Follies	Phyllis Rogers Stone	Broadway, Marquis Theatre	
2012	Follies	Phyllis Rogers Stone	Regional, Ahmanson Theatre	
2013	The Castle: A Triumph	Skinner	Off-Broadway, Atlantic Stage 2	
2014	The City of Conversation	Hester Farris	Off-Broadway, Mitzi E. Newhouse Theater	
2015	Scenes From an Execution	Galactia	Off-Broadway, Atlantic Stage 2	

=== Film ===
Year	Title	Role
2000	Something Sweet	
2015	I Am Michael	Coltry
2015	Left Behind	Alison

=== Television ===
Year	Title	Role	Notes
1994–2003	Law & Order	Dr. Nancy Haas	Episode: "Second Opinion"
1994–2003	Law & Order	Sarah Talbert	Episode: "Denial"
1994–2003	Law & Order	Marian Reger	Episode: "Dissonance"
1994–2003	Law & Order	Judge Ruth Alexander	Episode: "Floater"
2007	All My Children	Judge Myatt	3 episodes
2009	One Life to Live	Cindy	5 episodes
2009–2011	Gossip Girl	Headmistress Queller	5 episodes
2012	Dick Punch	Mom (voice)	4 episodes
2014	The Divide	Maxine	6 episodes
2014	The Good Wife	Camilla Vargas	2 episodes
2015–2016	Billy & Billie	Candice	7 episodes
2016	BrainDead	Ella Pollack	9 episodes
2017	Gotham	Margaret Hearst	Episode: "Mad City: Ghosts"
2017	Madam Secretary	Vice President Teresa Hurst	Episode: "Swept Away"

== Awards and nominations ==
Year	Award	Category	Nominated work	Result
2003	Lucille Lortel Award	Outstanding Featured Actress in a Play	My Old Lady	Won
2003	Drama Desk Award	Outstanding Featured Actress in a Play	My Old Lady	Nominated
2004	Drama Desk Award	Outstanding Featured Actress in a Play	Sixteen Wounded	Nominated
2005	Tony Award	Best Performance by a Featured Actress in a Musical	Chitty Chitty Bang Bang	Nominated
2005	Drama Desk Award	Outstanding Featured Actress in a Musical	Chitty Chitty Bang Bang	Won
2006	Drama Desk Award	Outstanding Actress in a Play	Entertaining Mr. Sloane	Nominated
2007	Tony Award	Best Performance by a Featured Actress in a Play	Coram Boy	Nominated
2007	Drama Desk Award	Outstanding Featured Actress in a Play	Coram Boy	Nominated
2009	Drama Desk Award	Outstanding Actress in a Play	Scenes From an Execution	Nominated
2010	Drama Desk Award	Outstanding Actress in a Play	The Royal Family	Won
2010	Tony Award	Best Performance by a Leading Actress in a Play	The Royal Family	Nominated
2010	Tony Award	Best Performance by a Featured Actress in a Play	Lend Me a Tenor	Nominated
2012	Tony Award	Best Performance by a Leading Actress in a Musical	Follies	Nominated
2012	Drama Desk Award	Outstanding Actress in a Musical	Follies	Nominated
2014	Drama Desk Award	Outstanding Featured Actress in a Play	The Castle	Nominated
2015	Drama Desk Award	Outstanding Actress in a Play	The City of Conversation	Nominated
2015	Lucille Lortel Award	Outstanding Lead Actress in a Play	The City of Conversation	Nominated

== See also ==
- List of Tony Award records
