= Taraborrelli =

Taraborrelli is a surname. Notable people with the surname include:

- Arnold Taraborrelli (1931–2024), American choreographer
- Cristian Taraborrelli (born 1970), Italian designer, costume designer, and director
- J. Randy Taraborrelli, American journalist and celebrity biographer
