= The Seduction of Almighty God by the Boy Priest Loftus in the Abbey of Calcetto, 1539 =

- Original language: English
- Written by: Howard Barker
- Setting: England, 1539

Premiere
- Place: Birmingham Repertory Theatre

The Seduction of Almighty God by the Boy Priest Loftus in the Abbey of Calcetto, 1539 (often shortened to The Seduction of Almighty God) is a play by British playwright Howard Barker. Originally written during 1997, it premiered at The Door, Birmingham Rep on 2nd November 2006 in a production by the Wrestling School theatre company and directed by French theatre director Guillaume Dujardin.

== Synopsis ==
The play is set during the dissolution of the English monasteries. Its themes are loss of faith and corruption among the priesthood at the time. The arrival at the monastery mentioned in the play's title of a young novice with an unsullied belief in God challenges prevailing practices by the abbey's priests.

== Characters ==
Character names and descriptions taken from the published playtext:

- LOFTUS, a Boy
- RAGMAN, an Abbot
- PENGE, a Priest
- SHELF, a Female Baker
- VOLUME, Mother to Loftus
- COOTER, a Priest
- BOX, an Official
- FELLOW, Wife to Box
- EXX, a Labourer
- FIRST INTRUDER, male
- SECOND INTRUDER, male
- COTTON, an Official
- BATH, Wife to Cotton
- BIRO, an Insurance Man
- NAPE, Wife to Biro

== Original production ==
The original production of The Seduction of Almighty God arose from a collaboration between Barker and French theatre professionals. Barker directed a production of his play Animaux En Paradis (Animals in Paradise) which was staged in Rouen, France during March 2005. Two bilingual French actors who appeared in that production joined The Wrestling School theatre company to help stage The Seduction of Almighty God. Director Guillaume Dujardin had previously directed a stage production of Barker's television play Brutopia in France. The Wrestling School website notes that the two French actors and Dujardin "brought a wealth of experience and fresh ideas to the interpretation and realisation of Howard Barker's work from their highly successful work on Howard's plays in France."

The play premiered at The Door, Birmingham Rep on 2nd November 2006.
Directed by Guillaume Dujardin and produced by The Wrestling School in association with the Mala Noche Company.
Cast:

- LOFTUS - Leander Deeny
- RAGMAN / BIRO - Peter Marinker
- PENGE / BOX - Christian Bradley
- SHELF / BATH - Judith Siboni
- VOLUME / NAPE - Miranda Cook
- COOTER / FIRST INTRUDER - Christian Pageault
- FELLOW - Caroline Corrie
- EXX / SECOND INTRUDER / COTTON - Philip Sheppard

This production then toured where it was performed at the following venues:
at Mercury Theatre, Colchester from 8th - 11th November 2006,
at Lighthouse, Poole on 14th and 15th November 2006,
at Riverside Studios, London from 5th - 9th December 2006.

== Critical reception ==
Reviewer Duska Radosavljevic wrote in trade paper The Stage that 'the production’s strength rests on a Barkerian juxtaposition of the intellectual and the visceral within a bleached out, ascetic and abstracted frame.'
