= Ian McDiarmid =

Scottish actor and stage director (born 1944)

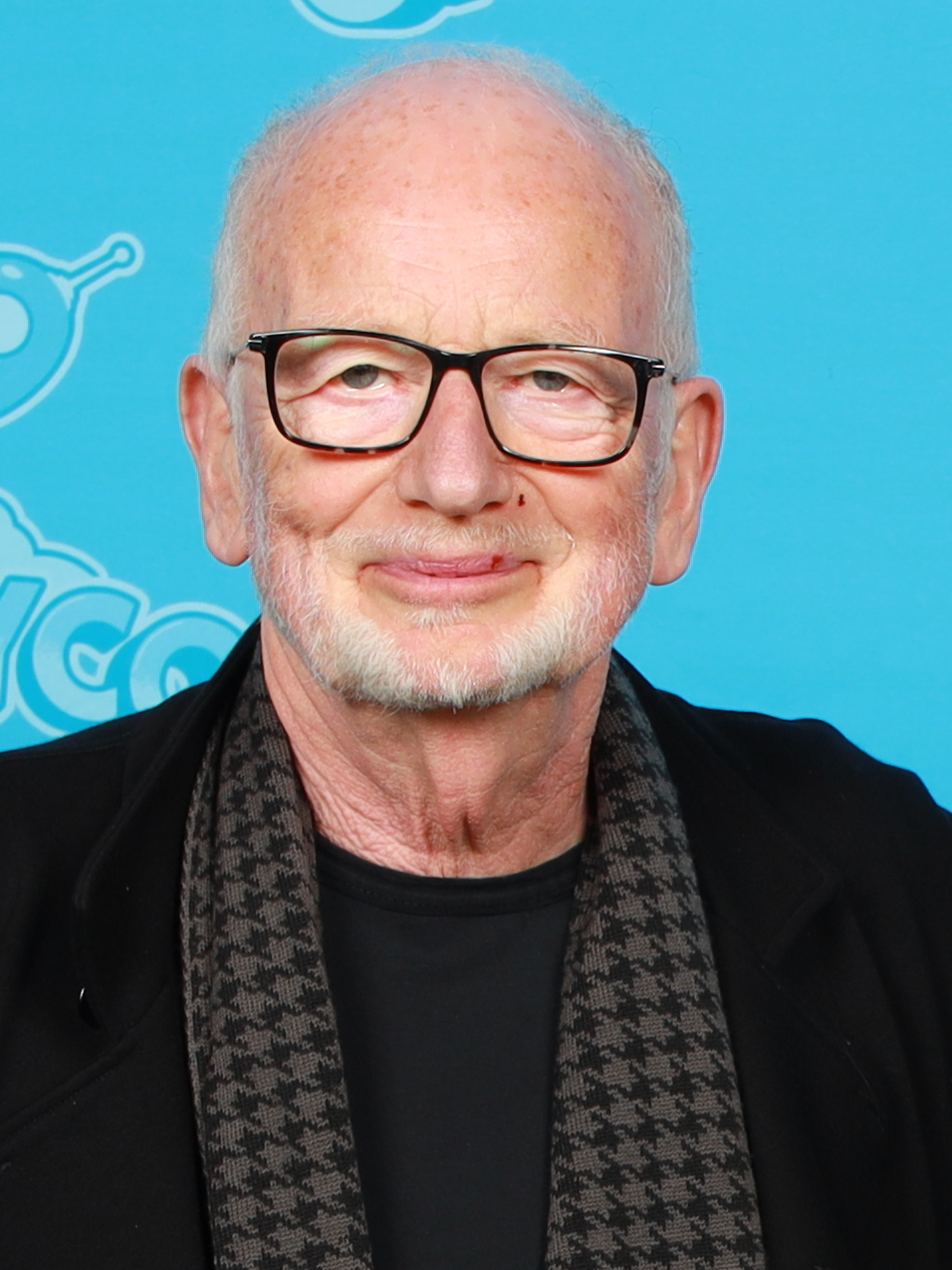
- McDiarmid in 2024
- Born: 11 August 1944 (age 82); Carnoustie, Angus, Scotland
- Education: University of St Andrews (MA); Royal Conservatoire of Scotland
- Occupations: Actor; director
- Years active: 1972–present

Ian McDiarmid (/məkˈdɜːrmɪd/ mək-DUR-mid; born 11 August 1944) is a Scottish actor and director of stage and screen. He is best known internationally for portraying Emperor Palpatine in the Star Wars franchise.

Making his stage debut in Hamlet in 1972, McDiarmid joined the Royal Shakespeare Company in 1974, and has since starred in a number of William Shakespeare's plays. He has received an Olivier Award for Best Actor for Insignificance (1982) and a Tony Award for Best Featured Actor in a Play for Faith Healer (2006).

In addition to portraying Palpatine in Star Wars, he also acted in Gorky Park (1983), Dirty Rotten Scoundrels (1988), Restoration (1995), Sleepy Hollow (1999) and The Lost City of Z (2016).

== Early life ==
McDiarmid was born in Carnoustie, Angus, Scotland, on 11 August 1944. He became a theatre aficionado at the age of five when his father took him to see an act named Tommy Morgan at a theatre in Dundee. In 2004 he said, "It sort of fascinated me, and it also scared me. All those lights, all that make-up. I said to myself, 'I don't know what this is, but I want it.'"

However, fearing his father's disapproval, McDiarmid attended Queen's College, Dundee (now the University of Dundee, but then a constituent part of the University of St Andrews), where he received a Master of Arts in psychology. Soon after, he decided to pursue a career in the theatre instead, and took acting training courses at the Royal Scottish Academy of Music and Drama in Glasgow.

In 1968 McDiarmid received a gold medal for his work from the Royal Scottish Academy of Music and Drama, the first of many recognitions given to him for his work in the theatre. McDiarmid said he became its recipient "by doing all the boring jobs you have to do when you are young, to eke out an existence."

== Career ==
=== Theatre ===
McDiarmid has worked as an actor and director in British theatre. He has starred in several Shakespeare plays, including Hamlet (1972), The Tempest (1974, 2000), Much Ado About Nothing (1976), Trevor Nunn's 1976 Macbeth (television 1978), The Merchant of Venice (1984) and King Lear (2005). He played Ivanov in Tom Stoppard's play Every Good Boy Deserves Favour at the Mermaid Theatre in 1978.

From 1990 McDiarmid and Jonathan Kent served as the artistic directors of the Almeida Theatre in Islington, London, gaining the commitment of prominent actresses such as Glenda Jackson and Claire Bloom for their productions. The two men resigned in 2001 with the venue in good shape. Their tenure was marked by a string of highly successful performances involving actors such as Kevin Spacey and Ralph Fiennes. While connected with the Almeida, McDiarmid directed plays such as Venice Preserv'd (1986) and Hippolytus (1991). In 2002 McDiarmid won Almeida Theatre's Critic's Circle Award for Best Actor for his role as Teddy in a revival of Brian Friel's Faith Healer. Five years later in 2006, he reprised this role in his debut on Broadway. Directed by Kent, he performed alongside Fiennes and Cherry Jones, and won the Tony Award for Best Performance by a Featured Actor in a Play. From April to June 2012 he played the title role in Timon of Athens at Chicago Shakespeare Theater.

He portrayed Harry Hackamore in Sam Shepard's play Seduced. McDiarmid described Hackamore as a Howard Hughes-type character. To play the part, he was made-up in prosthetics, including a false beard and long fingernails. McDiarmid was only 37 at the time, and this convinced George Lucas and Richard Marquand that he could convincingly play a much older character in extreme cinematic close-up, which helped him land the role of Palpatine.

=== Star Wars ===
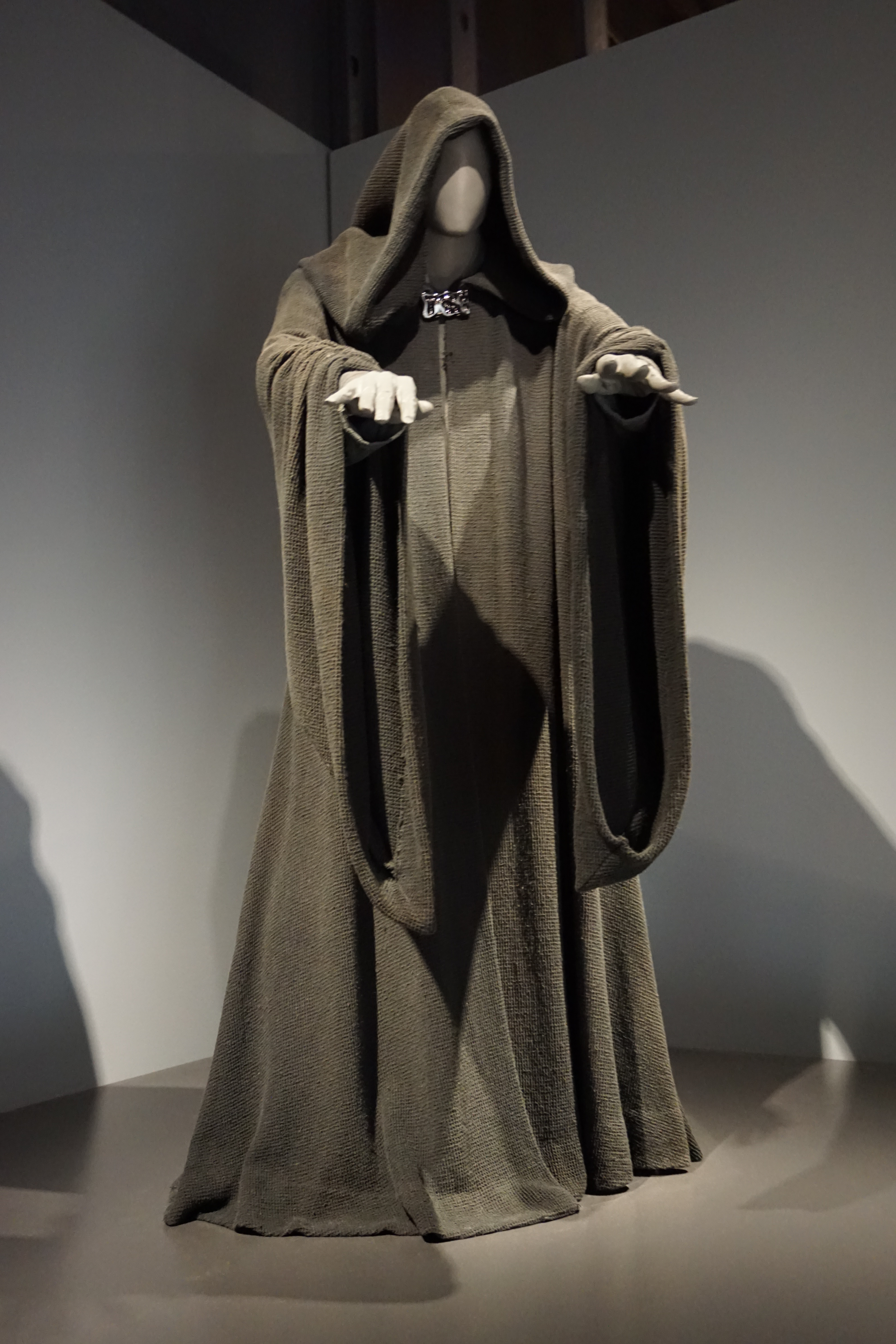
McDiarmid's robes from Return of the Jedi (1983) on display at the Detroit Institute of Arts

After a minor part in the film Dragonslayer (1981), McDiarmid was cast by Lucas in Return of the Jedi (1983) as the Emperor, the film's villain. CNN named McDiarmid fourth in their top 10 British villains, stating it was his "darkly seductive voice" that "stole the show", and it was a "masterclass in ruling through fear and manipulation." Sixteen years after Return of the Jedi, he reprised the role as the character's younger incarnation of Senator (and later Supreme Chancellor) Palpatine and the Sith Lord Darth Sidious in the prequel films: The Phantom Menace, Attack of the Clones and Revenge of the Sith. The prequels had him play two faces to his character; he re-created his diabolical interpretation of the Emperor from Return of the Jedi when playing Darth Sidious, Palpatine's Sith alter ego, but created a pleasant, charming character in Palpatine's public persona. McDiarmid portrayed Palpatine on-screen for the first time since Revenge of the Sith in the 2019 film Star Wars: The Rise of Skywalker, the third film in the sequel trilogy, and the ninth and final episode in the Skywalker saga.

In the 2004 re-release of The Empire Strikes Back, a brief scene between Darth Vader and a hologram of Darth Sidious was updated to include McDiarmid. The Emperor was originally voiced by Clive Revill for that scene, and visually portrayed by Marjorie Eaton. With this addition to The Empire Strikes Back, McDiarmid has now appeared in every live-action film version in which Sidious appears.

He has also worked with the Star Wars expanded universe as the voice of Darth Sidious in the video game adaptations of The Empire Strikes Back and Return of the Jedi: Super Star Wars: The Empire Strikes Back and Super Star Wars: Return of the Jedi. McDiarmid made a small appearance during Celebration Europe. From 23 to 26 August 2012, he attended Celebration VI in Orlando, Florida, and had his own show titled The Phantom Menace: Ian McDiarmid, hosted by James Arnold Taylor, in which he talked about his experience working on Star Wars and how he landed the role of Sidious. McDiarmid also voiced a pig version of Sidious for a promotional video for Angry Birds Star Wars II, entitled "Join the Pork Side". McDiarmid appeared as Darth Sidious in the 2022 TV series Obi-Wan Kenobi, using new scenes and archive material from the prequel trilogy. He also voiced Palpatine/Darth Sidious in Star Wars: The Bad Batch.

=== Television and radio ===
McDiarmid took an early role as Mickey Hamilton, a killer intent on avenging the death of his wife and child in The Professionals (series 2, episode 13) for London Weekend Television. In 1990 he appeared in the Central Independent Television series Inspector Morse's episode "Masonic Mysteries" as the psychopathic con man Hugo DeVries. In 1997 McDiarmid played the villain Ronald Hinks in the Touching Evil two-part episode "Through the Clouds/The Lost Boys". He played the role of a police detective named Porfiry Petrovich in the BBC's 2002 adaptation of Fyodor Dostoyevsky's novel Crime and Punishment. In 2003 McDiarmid took the role of the Stuart statesman Edward Hyde in the BBC series Charles II: The Power and The Passion.

In 2005 he portrayed Satan in the 41-part BBC Radio 4 drama based on John Milton's Paradise Lost, which was subsequently re-broadcast on BBC 7. He played the novelist Henry Fielding in the Channel 4 historical drama series City of Vice and Denis Thatcher in the 2009 television film Margaret.

McDiarmid played the intelligence chief LeClerc in a 2009 BBC Radio dramatisation of John le Carré's The Looking Glass War. In 2014, he played a leading role as the British Foreign Secretary Sir Edward Grey in the BBC television drama 37 Days, which is about the diplomatic crisis preceding the First World War. He also had a recurring role on series 2 of Utopia, playing the role of Anton. In September 2016 McDiarmid starred in the audio podcast drama series Akiha Den Den. He played Cuttings, a ham radio buff who picks up a mysterious voice (Joy McAvoy) coming from an abandoned amusement park, and Prospero in a BBC Radio 3 "new, environmentally-inflected production of The Tempest to coincide with COP26 in Glasgow", on 7 November 2021.

== Personal life ==
In 2009 The Scotsman referred to McDiarmid as an "atheist of Presbyterian stock", and in 2014 The Independent described him as having no religious faith.

== Work in theatre ==
=== Stage appearances ===
- Hamlet, Open Space Theatre, London, 1972
- And They Put Handcuffs on the Flowers, Open Space Theatre, London, 1973
- In the Jungle of Cities, Place Theatre, London, 1973
- Macbeth, Belgrade Theatre, Coventry, England, 1973, then Bankside Globe Theatre, London, 1973
- Measure for Measure, Royal Shakespeare Company, Stratford-on-Avon, England, 1974
- Macbeth, Royal Shakespeare Company, Aldwych Theatre, London, 1975
- Macbeth, Royal Shakespeare Company, Other Place Theatre, Stratford-on-Avon, England, 1976
- Destiny, Royal Shakespeare Company, Other Place Theatre, 1976
- Dingo, Royal Shakespeare Company, Other Place Theatre, 1976
- Schweyk in the Second World War, Royal Shakespeare Company, Other Place Theatre, 1976, then Warehouse Theatre, London, 1977
- Much Ado About Nothing, Royal Shakespeare Company, Royal Shakespeare Theatre, Stratford-on-Avon, 1976, then Aldwych Theatre, 1977
- That Good Between Us, Royal Shakespeare Company, Warehouse Theatre, 1977
- Macbeth, Royal Shakespeare Company, Warehouse Theatre, 1977
- The Days of the Commune, Royal Shakespeare Company, Aldwych Theatre, 1977
- Dingo, Royal Shakespeare Company, Warehouse Theatre, 1978
- Every Good Boy Deserves Favour, Mermaid Theatre, London, 1978
- Peer Gynt by Henrik Ibsen, Oxford Playhouse, 1980
- Mephisto, adapted by Gordon McDougall from the book by Klaus Mann, Oxford Playhouse Company, The Roundhouse Theatre, London, 1981
- The Worlds, New Half Moon Theatre, London, 1981
- Ezra, New Half Moon Theatre, 1981
- Insignificance, Royal Court Theatre, London, 1982
- Tales from Hollywood, National Theatre, 1983
- The Wild Duck by Henrik Ibsen, the Royal Exchange, Manchester, 1983
- The Merchant of Venice, Royal Shakespeare Company, The Pit (Barbican Centre), 1984
- The Party, Royal Shakespeare Company, The Pit (Barbican Centre), London, 1985
- Henry V, Royal Shakespeare Company, Barbican Theatre, London, 1985 (Chorus)
- The War Plays, Royal Shakespeare Company, The Pit (Barbican Centre), 1985
- Crimes in Hot Countries, Royal Shakespeare Company, The Pit (Barbican Centre), 1985
- The Castle, Royal Shakespeare Company, The Pit (Barbican Centre), 1985
- Downchild, Royal Shakespeare Company, The Pit (Barbican Centre), 1985
- Edward II, Royal Exchange Theatre, Manchester, England, 1986
- The Saxon Shore, Almeida Theatre Company, Almeida Theatre, 1986
- Creditors, Almeida Theatre Company, Almeida Theatre, 1986
- The Danton Affair, Royal Shakespeare Company, Barbican Theatre, 1986
- The King Goes Forth to France, Royal Opera, Covent Garden, 1987 (Froissart)
- Don Carlos, Royal Exchange Theatre, 1987 (King Philip)
- The Black Prince, Aldwych Theatre, 1989
- Volpone, Almeida Theatre Company, Almeida Theatre, 1990
- The Rehearsal, Almeida Theatre Company, Almeida Theatre, 1990
- Lulu, Almeida Theatre Company, Almeida Theatre, 1991
- Hippolytus, Almeida Theatre Company, Almeida Theatre, 1991
- The School for Wives, Almeida Theatre Company, Almeida Theatre, 1993
- Hated Nightfall, Royal Exchange Theatre, Manchester, England, 1995
- Tartuffe, Almeida Theatre Company, Almeida Theatre, 1996
- The Government Inspector, Almeida Theatre Company, Almeida Theatre, 1997
- The Doctor's Dilemma, Almeida Theatre Company, Almeida Theatre, 1998
- The Jew of Malta, Almeida Theatre, 1999
- The Tempest, Almeida Theatre, 2000–01
- Faith Healer, Almeida Theatre Company, Almeida Theatre, 2001
- Faith Healer, Gate Theatre in Dublin, 2001–2002
- The Embalmer, Almeida Theatre Company, Almeida Theatre, 2002
- Henry IV, Royal Exchange Theatre, Manchester, England, 2004
- Lear, Sheffield Crucible, 2005
- Faith Healer, Booth Theatre, 2006
- John Gabriel Borkman, Donmar Warehouse, 2007
- Jonah and Otto, Manchester Royal Exchange, 2008
- Be Near Me, National Theatre of Scotland and Donmar Warehouse, 2009
- Six Characters in Search of an Author, Headlong Theatre, 2008–2010
- The Prince of Homburg, Donmar Warehouse, 2010
- Emperor and Galilean, National Theatre, 2011
- The Faith Machine, Royal Court Theatre, 2011
- Timon of Athens, Chicago Shakespeare Theater, 2012
- Life of Galileo, Royal Shakespeare Company, Stratford, 2013
- Merchant of Venice, Almeida, London, 2014
- What Shadows, Birmingham Repertory Theatre, Birmingham, 2016
- The Lemon Table, Salisbury Playhouse, Wiltshire Creative, Sheffield Crucible, Cambridge Arts Theatre, Yvonne Arnaud Theatre, HOME Manchester, Malvern Theatres, 2021
- The Caretaker, Minerva Theatre, Chichester, 2024
- King Lear, Crucible Theatre, Sheffield, 2026

=== Stage director ===
- Venice Preserv'd, Almeida Theatre Company, Almeida Theatre, 1986
- Dom Juan, Royal Exchange Theatre, 1988
- The Possibilities, Almeida Theatre Company, Almeida Theatre, 1988
- Scenes from an Execution, Almeida Theatre, 1990
- The Rehearsal, Almeida Theatre Company, Almeida Theatre, 1990
- Volpone, Almeida Theatre Company, Almeida Theatre, 1990
- Lulu, Almeida Theatre Company, Almeida Theatre, 1991
- Hippolytus, Almeida Theatre Company, Almeida Theatre, 1991
- A Hard Heart, Almeida Theatre Company, Almeida Theatre, 1992
- Venice Preserv'd, Almeida Theatre Company, Almeida Theatre, 1995

== Filmography ==
=== Film ===
Year	Title	Role	Notes	Ref.
1976	The Likely Lads	Vicar		
1980	Sir Henry at Rawlinson End	Reg Smeeton		
1980	The Empire Strikes Back	The Emperor	2004 re-release and subsequent only, previously portrayed by Marjorie Eaton (appearance) and Clive Revill (voice)	
1980	Richard's Things	Burglar		
1980	The Awakening	Dr. Richter		
1981	Dragonslayer	Brother Jacobus		
1983	Return of the Jedi	The Emperor		
1983	Gorky Park	Professor Andreev		
1988	Dirty Rotten Scoundrels	Arthur		
1995	Restoration	Ambrose		
1999	Star Wars: Episode I – The Phantom Menace	Senator Palpatine / Darth Sidious		
1999	Sleepy Hollow	Dr. Thomas Lancaster		
2002	Star Wars: Episode II – Attack of the Clones	Supreme Chancellor Palpatine / Darth Sidious		
2005	Star Wars: Episode III – Revenge of the Sith	Supreme Chancellor Palpatine / Darth Sidious	Nominated — Saturn Award for Best Supporting Actor; Nominated — Teen Choice Award for Choice Movie Villain	
2016	The Lost City of Z	Sir George Goldie		
2019	Star Wars: The Rise of Skywalker	Emperor Palpatine / Darth Sidious	Nominated — Saturn Award for Best Supporting Actor	

=== Television ===
Year	Title	Role	Notes
1976	Red Letter Day	Blade	Episode: "Amazing Stories"
1979	Macbeth	Ross / The Porter	Television film
1979	The Professionals	Mickey Hamilton	Episode: "The Madness of Mickey Hamilton"
1981	ITV Playhouse	Fedka	Episode: "Last Night Another Dissident..."
1983	The Nation's Health	Doctor Vernon Davis	4 episodes
1985	Pity in History	Murgatroyd	Television film
1988	The Modern World: Ten Great Writers	Fyodor Dostoyevsky	Episode: "Crime and Punishment"
1990	Inspector Morse	Hugo De Vries	Episode: "Masonic Mysteries"
1991	Chernobyl: The Final Warning	Dr. Vatisenko	Television film
1993	The Young Indiana Jones Chronicles	Professor Levi	Episode: "Paris, October 1916"
1993	Heart of Darkness	Doctor	Television film
1993	Selected Exits	George Devine	Television film
1995	Annie: A Royal Adventure!	Dr. Eli Eon	Television film
1996	Karaoke	Oliver Morse	4 episodes
1996	Cold Lazarus	Oliver Morse	Episode #1.3
1996	Hillsborough	Dr. Popper	Television film
1997	An Unsuitable Job for a Woman	Ronald Callender	Episode: "Sacrifice"
1997	Rebecca	Coroner	Episode #1.2
1997	Touching Evil	Ronald Hinks	2 episodes
1999	Great Expectations	Jaggers	Television film
1999	All the King's Men	Rev. Pierrepoint Edwards	Television film
2002	Crime and Punishment	Porfiry Petrovich	Television film
2003	Charles II: The Power and The Passion	Sir Edward Hyde	Television film
2004	Spooks	Prof. Fred Roberts	Episode #3.2
2005	Our Hidden Lives	B. Charles	Television film
2005	Elizabeth I	Lord Burghley	2 episodes
2008	City of Vice	Henry Fielding	5 episodes
2009	Margaret	Denis Thatcher	Television film
2014	37 Days	Sir Edward Grey	3 episodes
2014	Utopia	Anton / Phillip Carvel	5 episodes
2018	Britannia	King Pellenor	9 episodes
2018	Star Wars Rebels	Emperor Palpatine / Darth Sidious (voice)	3 episodes; Re-dubbed lines for an earlier 2015 episode "The Siege of Lothal" that were originally voiced by Sam Witwer
2018	Star Wars Galaxy of Adventures	Emperor Palpatine / Darth Sidious (voice)	Episode: "Luke vs. Emperor Palpatine - Rise to Evil" (archive recording only)
2020	Star Wars: The Clone Wars	Darth Sidious (voice)	Episode: "Shattered" (archive recording only)
2021—2024	Star Wars: The Bad Batch	Emperor Palpatine / Darth Sidious (voice)	2 episodes (Also archive recording only in episode: "Aftermath")
2022	Obi-Wan Kenobi	Emperor Palpatine / Darth Sidious	Episode: "Part VI"; Episode: "Рart I" (archive material only)
2022	Tales of the Jedi	Darth Sidious (voice)	Episode: "The Sith Lord"

=== Video games ===
Year	Title	Role	Ref.
2013	Angry Birds Star Wars II	Emperor Palpatine (voice)	

== Awards and nominations ==
Year	Award	Work	Result
1968	Royal Scottish Academy of Music and Drama Gold Medal	—	Won
1982	Laurence Olivier Award for Best Actor in a New Play	Insignificance	Won
1985	Time Out Comedy Awards for Directing	Scenes from an Execution	Won
1990	Time Out Comedy Awards for Directing	Volpone	Won
1991	Observer Awards for Outstanding Achievement for Ten Years of Presenting Irish Drama (nominated)	Volpone, The Rehearsal, and Betrayal Field	Won
1995	Manchester Evening News Award for Best Actor	Hated Nightfall	Won
1998	Special Evening Standard Award for Theatrical Achievement of the Year (shared with Jonathan Kent)	—	Won
2001	Critics' Circle Theatre Award for Best Theatre Actor	Faith Healer	Won
2002	Clarence Derwent Award for Best Supporting Actor	Faith Healer	Won
2004	Manchester Evening News Award for Best Actor	Henry IV	Won
2004	Theatregoers' Choice Award for Best Actor	Henry IV	Won
2005	Theatregoers' Choice Award for Best Actor	King Lear	Won
2005	Saturn Award for Best Supporting Actor	Star Wars: Episode III – Revenge of the Sith	Nominated
2005	Teen Choice Award for Choice Movie Villain	Star Wars: Episode III – Revenge of the Sith	Nominated
2006	Drama League Award for Distinguished Performance	Faith Healer	Nominated
2006	Outer Critics' Circle Award for Outstanding Actor in a Play	Faith Healer	Nominated
2006	Theatre World Award for Outstanding Debut Performance	Faith Healer	Won
2006	Tony Award for Best Featured Actor in a Play	Faith Healer	Won
2021	Saturn Award for Best Supporting Actor	Star Wars: The Rise of Skywalker	Nominated
