= The Dying of Today =

- Written by: Howard Barker
- Characters: Dneister; The Barber

The Dying of Today is a one act play by British playwright Howard Barker.

Originally written by Barker in 2004, it was first staged in 2007 at Comédie de Caen, France in a version that had been translated into French by Isabelle Famchon and presented under the title of Révélations. This production was directed by Guillaume Dujardin and starred actors Michel Dubois and Jean-Marie Frin.

The play received its English premiere at London's Arcola Theatre in 2008, in a production by the Wrestling School theatre company, directed by Gerrard McArthur and performed by George Irving and Duncan Bell.

== Synopsis ==
The play is loosely based on Thucydides' account of the destruction of the Sicilian expedition of 413BC, which saw the Athenian army and navy suffering a heavy defeat. The play investigates the bringing home of such news of military defeat, and is set in a barber shop, where a survivor of the battle brings to the news to a - at first - silent barber.

== Critical reception ==
Reviewing the 2008 production at the Arcola, Dominic Cavendish of The Daily Telegraph praised the performances and 'interesting ideas.' Natasha Tripney in trade publication The Stage wrote that 'there is something hypnotic about these two men talking as the streets outside fill with wails of the bereaved' but also noted 'the play as a whole lacks emotional weight and feels distant, surface-skimming.'
