= Snap (TV series) =

British children's television series (1997–99)

- Genre: Children's; Comedy drama
- Created by: Ken Allen Jones
- Directed by: Charlie Hanson; Melanie Stokes; Carol Wiseman; Iain McLean
- Starring: Ian Reddington; Kirsty Bruce; Dean Cook; Gerard Horan (Series 1–2); Leanne Hailwood (Series 1–2); Victoria Wicks (Series 3)
- Composers: Alan Coates; Kim Goody
- Country of origin: United Kingdom
- Original language: English
- No. of series: 3
- No. of episodes: 20

Production
- Producer: Alan Horrox
- Running time: 25 minutes
- Production companies: Tetra Films and Carlton

Original release
- Network: CITV
- Release: 24 February 1997 – 4 May 1999

Snap is a British children's television comedy drama series was created by Ken Allen Jones and that aired on CITV in the United Kingdom between 24 February 1997 and 4 May 1999. It was produced by Tetra Films and Carlton Television for the ITV network.

== Cast ==
- Ian Reddington as Paul Devlin
- Kirsty Bruce as Alice Sherman
- Dean Cook as Ben Taylor
- Gerard Horan as Dave Taylor (Series 1–2)
- Leanne Hailwood as Ellen (Series 1–2)
- Victoria Wicks as Jane Taylor (Series 3)

== Episodes ==
=== Series overview ===
Series	Episodes	Originally released	
Series	Episodes	First released	Last released
1	6	24 February 1997	7 April 1997
2	7	23 February 1998	6 April 1998
3	7	23 March 1999	4 May 1999

=== Series 1 (1997) ===
Episodes aired on CITV on Mondays at 16:20.

No.	Title	Original release date
1	"Smile Please"	24 February 1997
2	"Stupid Cupid"	3 March 1997
3	"Teacher's Pet"	10 March 1997
4	"Hole in the Wall Gang"	17 March 1997
5	"The Birthday Surprise"	24 March 1997
6	"Finger of Fame"	7 April 1997

=== Series 2 (1998) ===
Episodes aired on CITV on Mondays at 16:20.

No.	Title	Original release date
7	"Flyaway Paul"	23 February 1998
8	"Ben Behaving Badly"	2 March 1998
9	"Bully's Beef"	9 March 1998
10	"Baby Talk"	16 March 1998
11	"Splash"	23 March 1998
12	"Checkmates"	30 March 1998
13	"Leaving Home"	6 April 1998

=== Series 3 (1999) ===
Episodes aired on CITV on Tuesdays at 16:10.

No.	Title	Original release date
14	"Slanging Rhyme"	23 March 1999
15	"Inspector Calls"	30 March 1999
16	"Model Mummy"	6 April 1999
17	"Divided Loyalties"	13 April 1999
18	"Private Function"	20 April 1999
19	"Neighbourhood Watch"	27 April 1999
20	"Missed Her Sister"	4 May 1999

== Filming locations ==
The programme is centred on a photographic studios in Hounslow, London.
