= Judith: A Parting from the Body =

Judith: A Parting from the Body (often shortened to Judith) is a play by British playwright Howard Barker. The script was first published in 1989 by Calder Publishing in a book alongside Barker's play The Europeans. Judith received its UK premiere in 1995 at the Leicester Haymarket Theatre in a production by the Wrestling School theatre company directed by Ace McCarron. In 1996 Barker himself directed the play for the company where it was performed in Edinburgh, Amsterdam and Gothenburg.

The play has since seen revivals on London's fringe theatre circuit, including productions at the Cock Tavern Theatre directed by Robyn Winfield-Smith, and at the Rosemary Branch Theatre directed by Teunkie Van Der Sluijs.

== Synopsis ==
Judith: A Parting from the Body is a retelling of the Apocryphal story of female heroism in the form of the Jewish Judith challenging and killing general Holofernes. In Howard Barker's retelling of the story, Judith discovers she holds strong feelings for Holofernes, and the ambiguity of her sacrifice is investigated.

== Critical reception ==
The British newspaper The Independent wrote of the original production that it was "..impeccably acted...visually gorgeous as it is profound......"
