= To Be or Not to Be (play) =

To Be or Not to Be is a play written by Nick Whitby, based on the 1942 film To Be or Not to Be. The play, described as a "black comedy" was produced by the Manhattan Theatre Club, and ran on Broadway in 2008.

== Plot ==
The time is 1939, the place is Warsaw, Poland. A theater troupe run by Josef and Maria Tura is involved in pre-war problems. Josef and Maria help catch a spy, with the aid of Stanislaw Sobinskya, a handsome fighter pilot. Stanislaw has a romantic yearning for Maria.

== Production ==
To Be or Not to Be premiered on Broadway at the Samuel J. Friedman Theatre on September 16, 2008, in previews and officially on October 14, for a limited engagement, closing on November 16 after 40 performances.

The director was Casey Nicholaw, with principal cast including Peter Benson, David Rasche, Peter Maloney and Jan Maxwell. Sets were by Anna Louizos, costumes by Gregg Barnes and lighting by Howell Binkley.

Several cast changes were made prior to the previews: David Rasche took over the part of Josef Tura from Craig Bierko, and Peter Maloney replaced Brian Murray in the role of Dowasz.

== Critical reception ==
The CurtainUp reviewer called the play an "overcooked theatrical perogi", but goes on to write that the play: "...does follow his [Lubitsch] comedy classic's basic plot of having the thespians foil a Nazi plan to entrap the leaders of the underground movement. Its few laughs come when the script sticks to Edwin Justus Mayer's screenplay...But it's all weighed down by added and unfunny jokes."
