= What Shadows =

2016 play by Chris Hannan

- Original language: English
- Written by: Chris Hannan

Premiere
- Date: 27 October 2016
- Place: The STUDIO, Birmingham Repertory Theatre

What Shadows is a play by Chris Hannan.

The play premiered in The STUDIO at Birmingham Repertory Theatre running from 27 October to 12 November 2016. The cast included Ian McDiarmid as Enoch Powell and directed by Roxana Silbert.

The play was revived at the Royal Lyceum Theatre, Edinburgh from 7 to 23 September before transferring to the Park Theatre, London from 27 September to 28 October 2017. McDiarmid reprised his role as Powell.
