= The Castle (play) =

Stage play by Howard Barker

The Castle: A Triumph
- Poster advertising The Wrestling School's 1993 production of the play in association with the Nottingham Playhouse
- Original language: English
- Written by: Howard Barker

Premiere
- Date: 18 October 1985
- Place: The Pit, Barbican Centre, Britain

The Castle: A Triumph (often shortened to The Castle) is a stage play by Howard Barker. It was performed 18 October – 22 November 1985 by the Royal Shakespeare Company at The Pit in The Barbican Centre as part of a season of three Barker plays (the other two being revival productions of Downchild and Crimes in Hot Countries). The play was directed by Nick Hamm with Ian McDiarmid playing the role of Stucley.

The play was, in part, inspired by the Greenham Common Women's Peace Camp, which was set up by female protestors who were campaigning for nuclear disarmament. Barker has stated that "Greenham was one of the starting points for The Castle – probably because my wife was involved with that. I found that a very symbolic event."

The Castle is regarded as being amongst Barker's "best known plays".

== Story ==
A knight named Stucley returns home to England after seven years of fighting abroad in the crusades. Upon his return he discovers that the land which he used to live on is now operating under a matriarchal system. This new female-led society rejects patriarchy, Christianity, law enforcement, ownership of land, monogamy and shameful feelings towards female genitalia.

Although Stucley had previously failed to conceive children with his wife Anne, he discovers that during his absence she has conceived and given birth to children with elderly men who had stayed in England during the crusades.

Enraged by his wife's infidelity and how the community has changed while he has been away, Stucley attempts to abolish the matriarchal structure and impose a societal system of his own.

Stucley has brought to England a captive from the crusades named Krak, an engineer who was spared in battle. Krak has been commissioned to design a castle that will be built to transform the landscape around them.

Stucley also commands a priest named Nailer to restore Christianity to the region. They together establish a new Christian sect called “The Church of Christ the Lover” which follows the “Gospel of the Christ Erect”, claiming that Jesus was not celibate and had sex with Mary Magdalene.

The play follows the conflict which intensifies between the men and women of the land while the castle grows more intricate and greater in size.

Although The Castle was originally billed as a "history play" and might initially appear to be set during the Middle Ages, the play has some anachronistic details which contradict this, including a moment where the sound of flying jets can be heard.

== Characters ==
- Stucley (male) – a knight
- Batter (male) – a servant
- Krak (male) – an engineer
- Skinner (female) – a witch
- Ann (male) – a changed woman
- Nailer (male) – a priest
- Cant (female) – a villager
- Hush (male) – a villager
- Sponge (male) – a villager
- Holiday (male) – a builder
- Brian (male) – a builder's mate
- Pool – a circuit judge

Also Prosecutors, Prisoners and Women, as well as Soldiers, including Baldwin, Roland, Reginald, Theobald, Soldier One and Soldier Two.

== Initial reception ==
Upon its initial production, The Castle generally received a varied critical reception, with many critics being divided over various elements of the play.

One such element was the mixture of poetic language and profanity in the play's dialogue. Those in praise included Michael Billington who wrote "What gives this play such force is Barker's language which is tart, comic, rich-textured and hard-consonanted". By contrast Milton Shulman was highly critical, citing lines of "verbal gibberish" and "pseudo-profundity" which "impresses Barker’s admirers [but] for the rest of us, his efforts to use words like a chop across the windpipe does become wearing", adding that "Obsessed by the potency of references to private parts, Barker displays an adolescent reliance on four-letter expletives to make his belligerent points." Although there were critics who disliked the play's obscene language there were others who defended it. Billington wrote that "Some may baulk at its insistent use of anatomical four-letter words but they're always nouns, never expletives." Benedict Nightingale wrote that "The more conventional have been upset by a proliferation of four-letter language that sometimes gives his dialogue an oddly childish ring […] Those four-letter words are Barker's way of emphasising how much of life, including political life, is infused by sex, determined by it." Other critics were more mixed in their feelings towards the play's dialogue, with Ian Herbert writing in Theatre Record "Is [Howard Barker] an effing (and blinding) genius, or an incurable logorrhoeiac?" when reflecting on the Pit's Barker season.

Critics were also split on the play's exploration of its many themes and intellectual ideas. Andrew Rissik declared the play to be "a piece of theatre whose intellectual range and depth of feeling continually amaze, disconcert and compel" whilst John Barber of The Daily Telegraph wrote "SETTING up shop as a dramatist of ideas, Howard Barker lacks the two basic requirement: a cool head, and a fertile intellect." Barker was criticised by a variety of critics for stuffing his play with too many themes and ideas whilst others appeared more positive in his handling of such material.

One such element was the play's political themes. Praise came from Andrew Rissik, stating that "Far from being narrowly polemic, this is a political drama in the widest, most searching and subversive sense", with Michael Billington writing that "what makes it a stirring theatrical fable […] is that the issues are never clear-cut". However, Milton Shulman was highly critical, dismissing The Pit's Barker Season for "flirt[ing] with obscenity, blasphemy, anarchy and verbosity […] in the name of feminism, Christian-baiting, England-bashing, anti-nuclear propaganda."

Although the play was noted for containing overt feminist themes, a number of critics felt this was partly undermined by certain elements of the play. David Nathan wrote that "[Barker] never bothers to substantiate central theme that women are less cruel than men and indeed sabotages it", with Benedict Nightingale writing that in the play "radical feminism is accused of being obverse Thatcherism" and that "[Barker’s] treatment of gender, sexuality, has never been comforting." The Listener's Jim Hiley had a more mixed opinion. He felt that Barker had created "a morality play, audacious yet subtle and generous" that "pits women […] as saviours […] on the side of life and nature, against men as demonic artificers [and] destroyers" and praised Barker for going "further than most" other male playwrights in writing "more complex female roles" and "conscientious[ly] squaring up to the challenge of feminism". However, Hiley felt that "Elsewhere, Barker seems caught in the very responses he seeks to dismantle" with elements of the play that "joltingly reminds us we're watching a play by a man" and where "Barker's analysis seems painfully stretched". Barney Bardsley for City Limits wrote that in the play "Barker denies the strength of women, but despises the tyranny of men in what turns out to be a moving and eloquent admission of defeat." Michael Billington was more supportive writing that "the play is far more than a simplistic championing of matriarchal values" and presented "a fascinating spiritual tussle in which competitive masculine destructiveness does battle with compassionate female creativity" in which Barker "is raising a vital moral question: how far could, and should, women go in order to change the values of society?" Giles Gordon declared The Castle to be "immeasurably the most sophisticated if difficult feminist play I've seen."

Various reviewers felt that the play was undermined by content that was obscene and excessive. John Barber wrote that "finding he cannot pursue an argument to the end, [Barker] whips himself into a rage of blasphemy, obscenity, gratuitous violence and sensationalism, with every possible effort to shock. His lurid imagination is seen at its best and worst in “The Castle” […] Powerful writing and boldly conceived characters jostle beside schoolboy silliness. What begins as a gripping feminist fable turns into hysterical hullaballoo." Milton Shulman wrote that Barker "does not know the meaning of excess. He thinks it means normal. Every issue he confront relies upon the shout, the shudder and the shock for its dramatic impact" and even stated that the actress Harriet Walter "should be demanding extra humiliation money for permitting herself to be attached to such a barbaric spectacle." In contrast other critics were more forgiving, with Giles Gordon stating "“Unpleasant” The Castle certainly is, but I fear it may be essential."

Despite many reviews finding flaws with Barker’s writing there were critics who responded more positively. Andrew Rissik wrote that "this magnificent new play refutes all but the most quibbling of objections" and Michael Billington wrote that The Castle "combines narrative thrust with scorching language and poetic power to make it, along with Pravda, the most exciting new play in London." A few critics viewed Barker’s play as an important work with Jim Hiley writing "we are indisputably in the presence of a major dramatist" and Billington declaring "this is, by any yardstick, a major play".

== Legacy ==
The Castle has been recognised as one of Barker's "best known plays".

The Castle is listed as being one of the 100 "best and most influential plays" performed in Britain from 1945 – 2010 in the book and iPad app Played in Britain: Modern Theatre in 100 Plays.

In 2015 Exeunt Magazine published a "subjective list" of "great plays" in response to Michael Billington's list of The 101 Greatest Plays. One of the plays listed by Exeunt writer Duska Radosavljevic was The Castle.
