= Tetra Films =

British television production company

Tetra Films was a London-based independent production company, trading between 1992 and 2000.

== Films and television ==
Tetra Films was founded by Alan Horrox in 1992, the same year when classic ITV series The Tomorrow People was revived. Prior to this, Alan was a controller of children's programmes at Thames Television. It produced a wide range of programmes for ITV and Channel 4.

Notable contributions include:

- Cone Zone, Sitcom, Carlton/ITV, 1995-1997
- Delta Wave, Sci-fi drama, Meridian/ITV, 1996
- Mike and Angelo, Sci-fi sitcom, Thames/Carlton for ITV, 1989-2000
- Snap, Comedy-drama, Carlton for ITV, 1997-1999
- Rainbow Toy Shop Series, Pre-school, HTV for ITV, 1994-1995
- Rainbow Days, Pre-school, HTV for ITV, 1996-1997
- The Canterville Ghost, Drama (family feature), Carlton for ITV, 1997
- The Tomorrow People, Sci-fi drama, Thames/Central/Nickelodeon for ITV, 1992-1995
- The Treasure Seekers, Drama (TV Movie), Carlton for ITV, 1996
- Magic with Everything, Drama (adapted novel), ITV, 1998
- What Katy Did, Drama (family feature), Carlton for ITV, 2000
