= Puppet Theatre Barge =

Marionette theatre on a converted barge in London, England

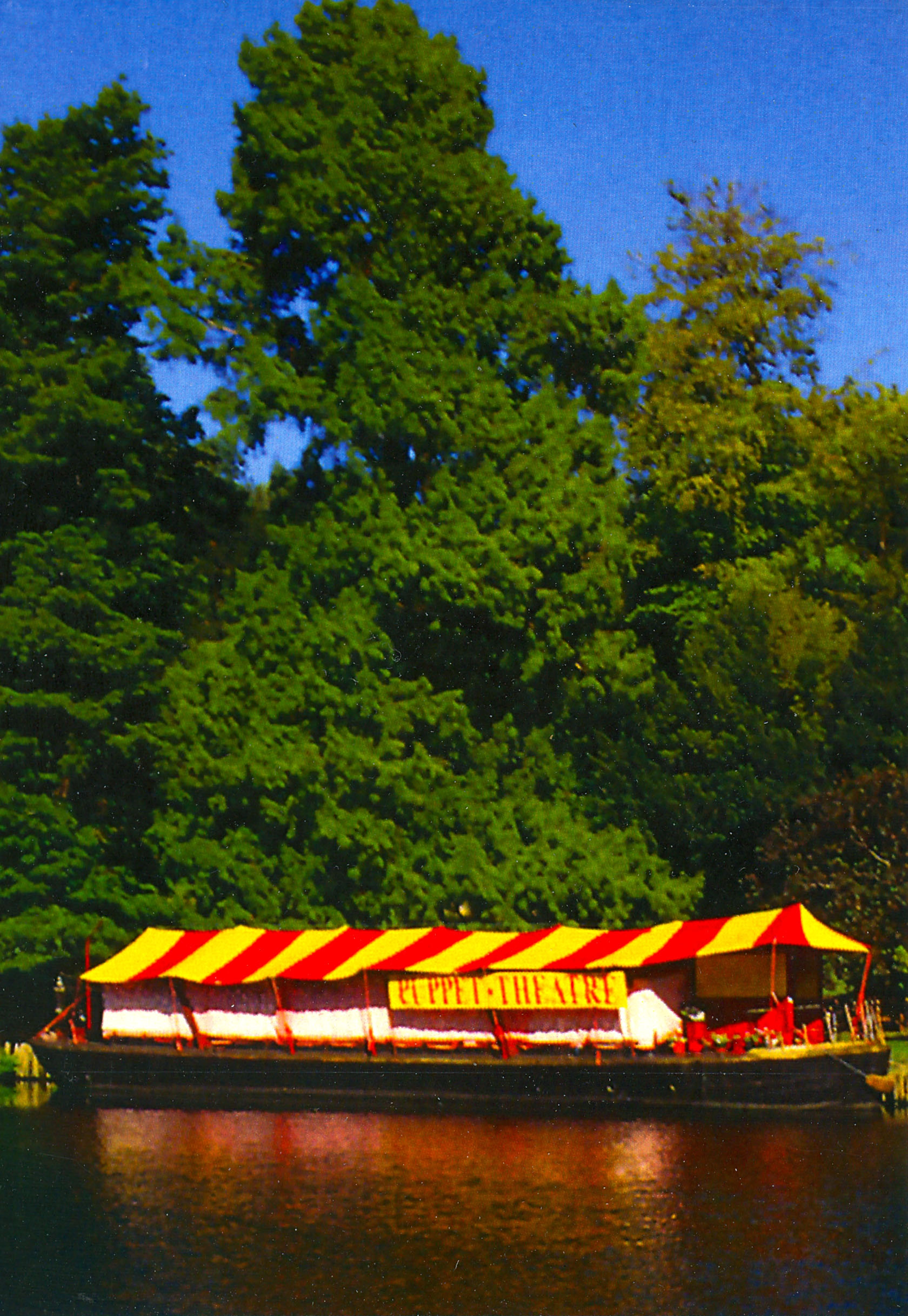
- Puppet Theatre Barge on the River Thames
- Interactive map of Puppet Theatre Barge
- Address: Little Venice & Richmond; London
- Coordinates: 51.5395°N 0.1032°W
- Capacity: 50 seats
- Type: marionette theatre

Construction
- Opened: 1982

Website
- www.puppetbarge.com

The Puppet Theatre Barge is a unique, fifty-seat marionette theatre on a converted barge in London. The theatre presents puppet shows for children and adults and is moored in Little Venice throughout the year and in Richmond-upon-Thames during the summer.

The company produces shows taken from traditional children's tales such as the Brer Rabbit stories, Aesop's Fables and original work featuring Punch, as well as drama by writers such as William Shakespeare and Federico García Lorca, and has also commissioned original plays from contemporary published writers, such as Wendy Cope, Howard Barker and Finuala Dowling.

== History ==
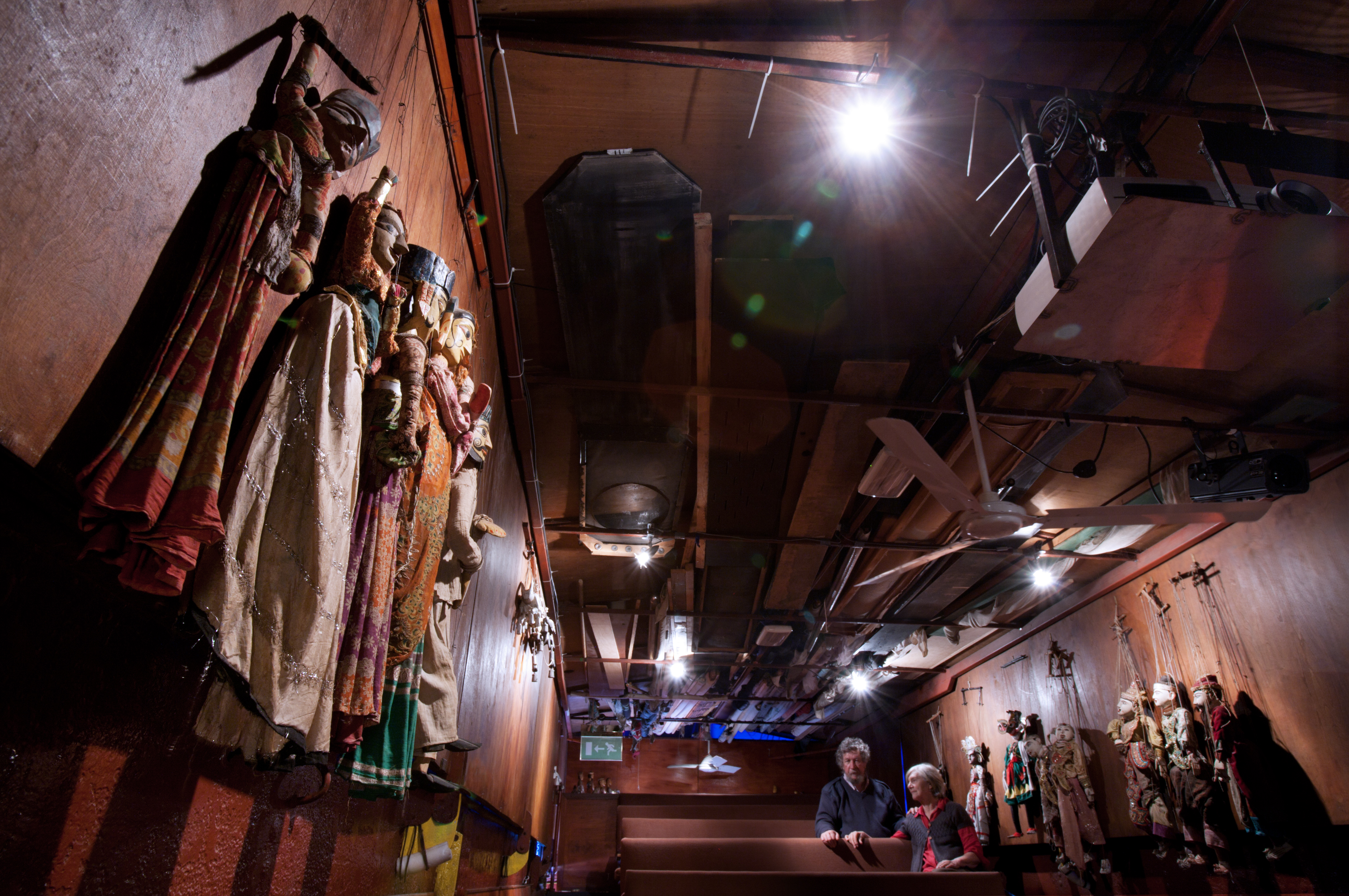
Barge interior

Gren Middleton and Juliet Rogers formed Movingstage Marionette Company in 1979. After a couple of years touring marionette shows, Middleton and Rogers bought an old 80-ft Thames lighter of riveted iron construction, built in the 1930s and converted it into a double-bridge string marionette theatre.

The Puppet Theatre Barge was opened to the public on 28 January 1982 at Camden Lock in north London. Its first performance was The Rhyme of the Ancient Mariner, by Samuel Taylor Coleridge.In 1988, the barge moved to the basin at Little Venice, near Paddington.

The first two summer tours, in 1982 and 1983, were undertaken up the Grand Union Canal, performing at Pitstone Wharf in Buckinghamshire, over the Tring summit. From 1984 until 2008 the barge toured every summer up the River Thames, performing daily shows as far upstream as Sandford-on-Thames, near Oxford. Over the years, the barge staged performances at Abingdon, Wallingford, Reading, Henley-upon-Thames, Marlow, Cliveden, Windsor and Walton-upon-Thames.

In 1995, Juliet Rogers designed News Bunny, the station mascot for the short-lived UK TV station L!VE TV.

Since 2009, the barge has put on shows in Little Venice from October to June and spent the summer months, between mid-July and mid-October, moored at Richmond-upon-Thames. Three generations of the Middleton family are involved in running the theatre.

In 2017, theatre critic Darren Luke Mawdsley visited the Puppet Theatre Barge to watch The Flight of Babuscha Baboon. He described his visit as '...a pleasure; an example of the rich and diverse arts offering that our fabulous city has to offer'.

On 17 October 2020, the Puppet Theatre Barge received a grant of £52,352 from the Culture Recovery Fund to support a staged reopening following its closure during the COVID-19 pandemic.

== Repertoire ==
- Sir Gawain and the Green Knight (1979)
- Bottom’s Dream (1980)
- The Birdman (1981)
- The Rhyme of the Ancient Mariner (1982)
- Brer Rabbit and the Tar Baby (1982)
- The Magic Box (1983)
- Thomas the Rhymer (1984)
- The Butterfly’s Spell (1985)
- The Tempest (1987)
- The Flight of Babuscha Baboon (1988)
- The River Girl (1989)
- Tales from Aesop (1990)
- A Shipful of Verse (1992)
- All He Fears (1993)
- The Picture Stick (1995)
- Red Riding Hood (1996)
- Brer Rabbit visits Africa (1997)
- Captain Grimey and the Three Little Pigs (1998)
- Macbeth (1999) Voice by Toby Stephens Music by Andrew Ranken
- Millennium Mischief – Joey’s Fireworks (2000)
- The Swing at Night (2001)
- Manfred (2002)
- The Town Mouse and the Country Mouse (2003)
- Out of the Heart of Darkness (2005)
- Footprints in the Wilderness (2008), inspired by Ian Player
- A Christmas Carol (2008)
- The Money Game (2011)
- Fowl Play (2013)
- End Games (2015), based on Finuala Dowling's poetry
- The Red Balloon (2022)
- The Hare and the Tortoise (2022)
- Hanging by a Thread by Di Filippo Marionette (2023)
- The Blue Pool of Questions (2023)
- The Town Mouse and the Country Mouse (2023)
