= The Cabaret of Dr Caligari =

BBC radio comedy series

The Cabaret of Dr Caligari is a BBC Radio 4 comedy series first broadcast in November and December 1991. It was written by Alan Gilbey, and produced by Anne Edyvean.

Starring John Woodvine as Dr. Bryon Caligari, Victoria Wicks as Anthrax and Sylvester McCoy as Snuff, The Cabaret of Dr Caligari is a macabre comedy about the goings on at a night club owned by Dr Caligari. The episodes centre on the unpleasant actions of an individual (usually a character strongly associated with the 1980s), who finds themselves in Dr Caligari's nightclub, catching up with them in a suitably ironic way. The title of the series is a reference to the German Expressionist film The Cabinet of Dr. Caligari (1920). This has caused confusion for some listings sites, and some radio presenters have stumbled when introducing it. A previous use of "The Cabaret of Dr Caligari" was in The Sandman No.17, Calliope, 1989, in which it is a novel.

It was originally created as a late night live show created for the London Bubble Theatre Company featuring early career performances by Sharron D. Clarke, Lisa Spenz and Lynn Whitehead.

== Episodes ==
1. A Word in your Ear - a DJ is plagued by calls from those he has wronged until he cannot bear to go on listening...
  It featured Kerry Shale as DJ Rick O'Shea, Jane Whittenshaw as Tracey, Adjoa Andoh as Donna, Mark Straker as Keith and Clarence Smith as Sparks.
2. Comedian's Moon - an alternative comic, after an encounter with one of his former comedy heroes finds himself turning into something hideous...
  It featured Stephen Tompkinson as Kevin Scorch, Adjoa Andoh as Ali, Ronald Herdman as Bernie Cladding and Alan Barker as Sidney Grease. The jokes for this episode were written by Lee Hurst.
3. The Conversion - a yuppie, after cashing in on the publicity surrounding the strange project of "de-gentrification" her retired trade union leader father is undertaking, tries to have him sectioned only to be caught up in his dream...
  It featured Joanna May as Debbie Brothers, Roger Watkins as "Flash" Jack Brothers, Terence Edmond as Tom, Eric Allan as Dick, Ronald Herdman as Tarquin, Clarence Smith as Wayne, Alan Barker as Jeremy and Adjoa Andoh as the Estate Agent.
4. Teenage Psycho Chainsaw Bimbos - a video store owner and obsessive fan of horror films (of the second-rate slasher variety) finds himself trapped in a fantasy world of his own creation...
  It featured Stephen Tompkinson as Tope Romero, Cassie Macfarlane as Carrie, Jane Whittenshaw as Gail, Clarence Smith as the postman and Alan Barker as Damien.
5. The Homeless Who Ate London - a freak chemical spill turns the homeless of London into a giant blob. And the person responsible is a little surprising...
  It featured Jane Whittenshaw as the Computer, Charles Milham as the General, Alex Barker as Agent Orange, Gerald Denny as a Homeless Geordie, David McKinney as a Homeless Boy, Richard Tate as Professor Pseudonym, Ronald Herdman as the Driver, Sharon Henry as the Hitchhiker, and Cassie Macfarlane as Kate Pushy.
6. The Body Politic - an M.P. is introduced to the consequences of eroding the NHS...
  It featured John Shrapnel as Mr. Meagre, Adjoa Andoh as Mrs. Meagre, Cassie Macfarlane as the Past, Clarence Smith as the Present and Alan Barker as the Future.
