= The Dinner Party (play) =

Play by Neil Simon

The Dinner Party is a one-act comedy written by Neil Simon, about marriage and divorce; It is Simon's 31st play.

== Production ==
The Dinner Party had its world premiere at the Mark Taper Forum, Los Angeles, in December 1999 and then ran at the Kennedy Center for the Performing Arts in Washington, DC. in June and July 2000.

The play opened on Broadway at the Music Box Theatre on October 19, 2000 and closed on September 1, 2001 after 364 performances and 20 previews. Directed by John Rando, the cast featured Len Cariou (Andre Bouville), Veanne Cox (Yvonne Fouchet), Penny Fuller (Gabrielle Buonocelli), Jan Maxwell (Mariette Levieux), John Ritter (Claude) and Henry Winkler (Albert). The sets were by John Lee Beatty, costumes by Jane Greenwood and lighting by Brian MacDevitt.

Near the end of the run, Ritter and Winkler were replaced by Jon Lovitz and Larry Miller.

Fuller received a Tony nomination for Best Featured Actress in a Play.

== Background ==
In an interview in The New York Times (as reported by talkinbroadway.com), Simon said that "he was trying to write a play very different from anything he had done before, and that he 'had the concept of creating a farce up to a certain point, and then instead of continuing the farce, to make a turn to where it becomes quite serious. [He] wanted to break the concept that farces can never get real, even for a minute.' "

== Plot overview ==
Playwright Neil Simon, himself married five times, mines his own experience to create the thematic material for this unique farce-turned-dramedy. Six unknowing guests have RSVP'd to a dinner at a private dining room in a first-rate restaurant in Paris. Arriving in a staggered manner, they eventually realize they are three divorced couples—providing the makings of the farce Simon intends the first half of the play to be. Five of them were mistaken into thinking a man they hold in high regard (who happens to be the divorce lawyer) is hosting the party, but he never shows up, and appearances prove to be deceiving.

Claude Pichon and Albert Donay are the first to arrive, and Claude asks what the party is for, but Albert does not know either. As the three male guests arrive first and the female guests later, it only gradually unfolds that they are three divorced couples and that somebody has designs for them to be together.

After the shock wears off, the characters inevitably begin to analyze and emotionally process their past marriages, and the play ends on a hopeful note.

The play treats similar themes to Stephen Sondheim's Follies, but has a generally more upbeat ending and a more positive spin on breakups and the meaning of relationships.

== Reception ==
Ben Brantley in his New York Times review wrote: "The Dinner Party obviously hopes to invert a traditional comic form to reveal the truly absurd messes that so many people make of their marriages. Mr. Simon, who has been married five times, has reason to consider this subject. But no matter how profound his intentions, the play keeps shifting into automatic pilot, reflexively delivering barbs that glide over the surface instead of piercing it. The Dinner Party concludes on a tender, truly stirring note of pathos, bewilderment and affection for the foolish mortals who create such havoc for themselves. This sentimental moment is so palpably sincere, you wish you had been able to believe for a single instant in the events leading up to it."

== Awards and nominations ==
=== Original Broadway production ===
Year	Award	Category	Nominee	Result
2001	Theatre World Award		John Ritter	Won
2001	Tony Award	Best Featured Actress in a Play	Penny Fuller	Nominated
