= Acquario Romano =

Building in Rome

Roman Aquarium
- Acquario Romano
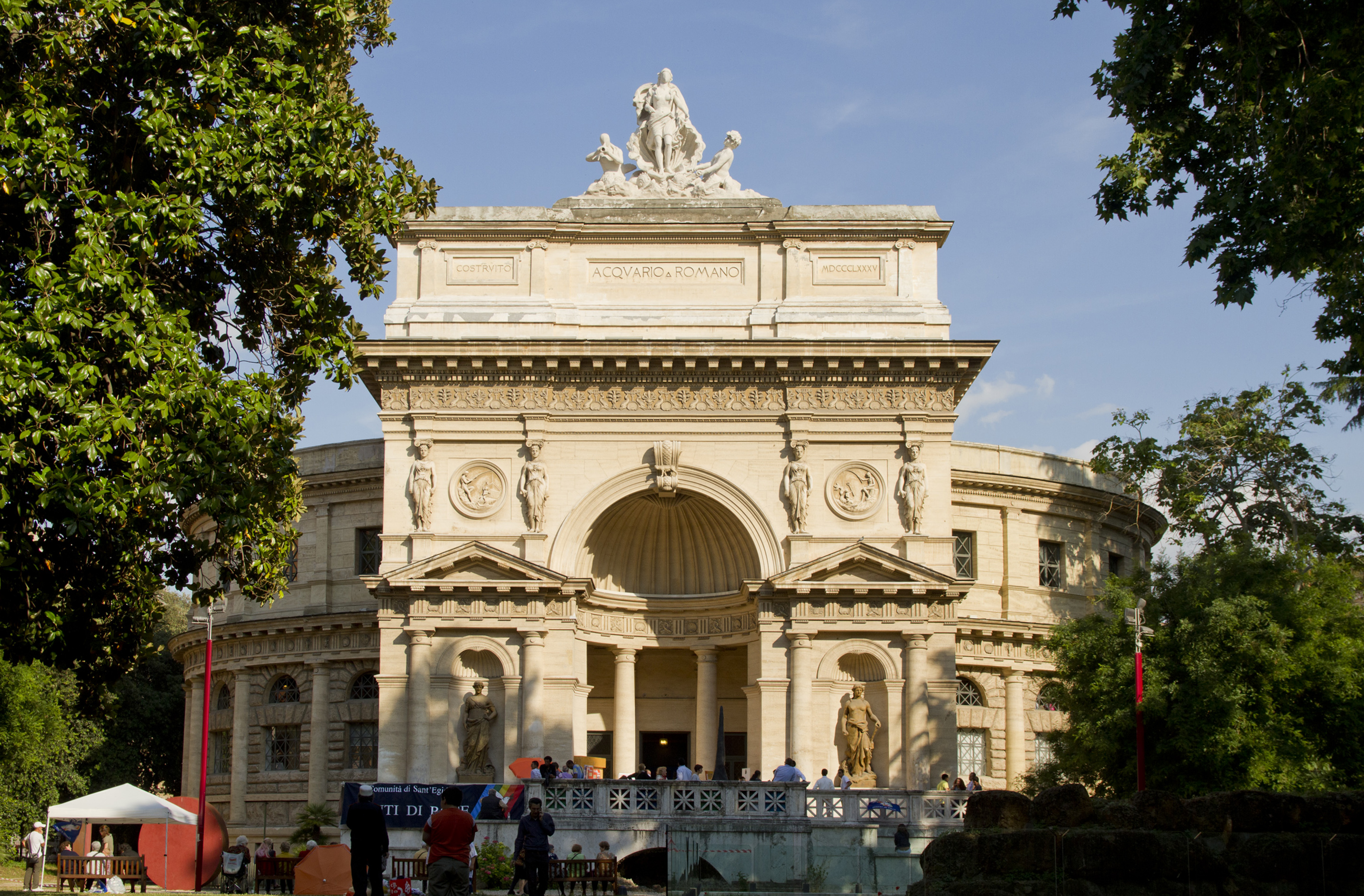
- Main facade of the Acquario Romano

- Location within Rome

General information
- Coordinates: 41.89792°N 12.50261°E

The Acquario Romano (Roman Aquarium) is situated in Piazza Manfredo Fanti, Rome, Italy.

== Description ==
Designed by Ettore Bernich and built between 1885 and 1887, the building hosted an aquarium for few years. It was later used as a depot of the near Teatro dell'Opera, and sometimes as a venue for fairs and exhibitions.

A typical building of the age of king Umberto I, it has a circular plan and shows a pronaos with aediculas. Decorations with marine subject are inserted between the sculptures into the aediculas; between the caryatids are placed some medallions. The cylindrical body of the building is subdivided by lesenes and pilasters.

After a period of abandon, it was restored and used as a museum and seat for performances and concerts. It presently hosts the Casa dell'Architettura.
