= Cone Zone =

British children's television series (1995–97)

- Genre: Children's sitcom
- Created by: Grant Cathro; Lee Pressman
- Directed by: Neville Green; Baz Taylor; Jo Johnson
- Starring: Natalie Morse; Victoria Hamilton; Mark Bagnall; Paul Shearer; Paul Reynolds; Ben Homewood; Kacey Ainsworth; Debra Stephenson; Susan Warren
- Theme music composer: Francis Haines
- Country of origin: United Kingdom
- Original language: English
- No. of series: 3
- No. of episodes: 18

Production
- Executive producer: Michael Forte
- Producer: Alan Horrox
- Cinematography: Bill Broomfield
- Editor: Michael Pike
- Running time: 27 minutes
- Production companies: Tetra Films and Carlton

Original release
- Network: CITV
- Release: 15 March 1995 – 2 April 1997

Cone Zone is a British children's sitcom series was created by Grant Cathro and Lee Pressman, it was originally aired on ITV as part of the children's programming block CITV and ran for three series and eighteen episodes between 15 March 1995 and 2 April 1997. The show was produced by Tetra Films and Carlton for the ITV network.

== Plot ==
The series sitcom about a pair of teenage school-leavers, Hayley (Natalie Morse) and Zandra (Victoria Hamilton), who open their own ice cream parlour called Cone Zone. It becomes the hippest, coolest place in town, driven by Hayley's strong sense of logic and Zandra's enthusiasm. But both can be swept off their feet by good-looking young men entering their parlour, and some customers prove problematic - as do boyfriends, nights off, fashion, environmental health officers and other distractions. The girls are assisted in their work by the spotty, bespectacled, long-haired loveable nerd Leo (Mark Bagnall), who serves in the parlour, and he helps them to fend off Hugh Bassett (Paul Shearer), the miserable manager of the shopping mall wherein Cone Zone is located.

By the third series of Cone Zone Hayley and Zandra had moved on and the parlour was under new ownership. Attractive, well-educated hippie Corrie Cunningham, prone to making decisions based upon horoscopes, is appointed as the new manager but she continues to employ Leo, and also his brash Brummie sister Loretta, who becomes assistant manager. Now the bane of their life is the smarmy con artist Rick Sullivan (Paul Reynolds). (Everyone, you'll gather, has their 'angle' - no one plays a straight role.)

== Cast ==
- Natalie Morse as Hayley (Series 1–2)
- Victoria Hamilton as Zandra (Series 1–2)
- Mark Bagnall as Leo Summers
- Paul Shearer as Mr Bassett (Series 1–2)
- Paul Reynolds as Rick Sullivan
- Ben Homewood as Nick (Series 1–2)
- Kacey Ainsworth as Loretta Summers (Series 2–3)
- Debra Stephenson as Corrie Cunningham (Series 3)
- Susan Warren as Marnie (Series 1 and 3)

== Episodes ==
=== Series overview ===
Series	Episodes	Originally released	
Series	Episodes	First released	Last released
1	6	15 March 1995	19 April 1995
2	6	6 February 1996	12 March 1996
3	6	26 February 1997	2 April 1997

=== Series 1 (1995) ===
Episodes aired on CITV on Wednesdays at 16:40.

No.	Title	Original release date
1	"The Writing on the Wall"	15 March 1995
2	"Sweet-talking Guy"	22 March 1995
3	"Hayley's Comet"	29 March 1995
4	"One for the Money"	5 April 1995
5	"Seeing Stars"	12 April 1995
6	"Sweeping Changes"	19 April 1995

=== Series 2 (1996) ===
Episodes aired on CITV on Tuesdays at 16:30.

No.	Title	Original release date
7	"Flavour of the Month"	6 February 1996
8	"Vote, Vote, Vote for Leo Summers"	13 February 1996
9	"Mary-Mary and the Health Officer"	20 February 1996
10	"Call Me Hugo"	27 February 1996
11	"The Runaway Bride"	5 March 1996
12	"Blind Date"	12 March 1996

=== Series 3 (1997) ===
Episodes aired on CITV on Wednesdays at 16:40.

No.	Title	Original release date
13	"Under New Management"	26 February 1997
14	"Uncle Frank and the Free Lunch"	5 March 1997
15	"High Flyer"	12 March 1997
16	"Ben Behaving Badly"	19 March 1997
17	"Like Peas in a Pod"	26 March 1997
18	"Dead Zone"	2 April 1997
