= Delta Wave =

Television series

Delta Wave is a British children's science fiction television drama series produced by Tetra Films. It aired on the ITV network from 3 January to 6 March 1996, lasting only a single 10-episode season. The show centered on three main characters, Dr. Ruby Munro and two children with psychic powers named Julia and Ed. The three have a series of adventures and strange encounters, including time travel back to the Victorian era.

The main cast included Robin McCaffrey as Dr. Ruby Munro, Ania Sowinski as Julia Stone and Jason Stracey as Ed Curtis. Additional cast included Una Stubbs who appeared in 4 episodes, Victoria Wicks who appeared in 4 episodes, and Peter Capaldi who appeared in 2 episodes.

== Episodes ==
Delta Wave consisted of five main storylines, each being split into 2 parts, with one episode broadcast per week (10 episodes in total). The episode titles and their transmission dates were as listed below;

- A Twist of Lemming: Parts 1 & 2 (3 – 10 January 1996)
- A Glitch in Time: Parts 1 & 2 (17 – 24 January 1996)
- Dodgy Jammers: Parts 1 & 2 (31 January – 7 February 1996)
- The Light Fantastic: Parts 1 & 2 (14 – 21 February 1996)
- Something Fishy: Parts 1 & 2 (28 February – 6 March 1996)
