= Gertrude – The Cry =

Play written by Howard Barker

Gertrude - The Cry
- Written by: Howard Barker
- Original language: English

Premiere
- Date premiered: 2002

Gertrude – The Cry is a play by British playwright Howard Barker. The play had its world premiere in 2002, directed by the author, in the great hall of Elsinore Castle, Denmark as part of the annual international Hamlet Festival. Its original production featured actors Tom Burke, Sean O'Callaghan, Jason Morell, Justin Avoth, Emma Gersch, Jane Bertish and Victoria Wicks.

Gertrude – The Cry is Howard Barker's reworking of Shakespeare's Hamlet, focusing on the character of Queen Gertrude, the mother of Prince Hamlet in Shakespeare's play. It is not the first time Barker took an existing play as the basis for a reworking. In 1991, he re-imagined Chekhov's Uncle Vanya in his play Vanya, and in 1986 he adapted Thomas Middleton's Women Beware Women.

Barker considers Gertrude to be one of his major works, remarking that "It's probably my best play... The one for which I feel the greatest satisfaction in".

== Characters ==
- Gertrude, a Queen
- Claudius, a Prince
- Cascan, Servant to Gertrude
- Hamlet, an Heir
- Isola, Mother of Claudius
- Ragusa, a Young Woman
- Albert, a Duke of Mecklenburg
