= Lucio Gregoretti =

Italian composer (born 1961)

Lucio Gregoretti (born 1961) is an Italian composer. He composed operas, symphonic and chamber music, electroacoustic music, as well as incidental music for theatre plays, musical comedies, and film scores.

== Biography ==
He studied composition with Mauro Bortolotti and music history with Bruno Cagli at the Conservatory of Santa Cecilia in the city of his birth, Rome, and there obtained his diploma. He also attended seminars and courses in composition with Sylvano Bussotti and Ennio Morricone, and courses in conducting with Franco Ferrara and Giampiero Taverna. He has been composer-in-residence at a number of institutions, including Instituto Sacatar (Brazil, 2006), the MacDowell Colony (New Hampshire, 2005 and 2006), Künstlerhäuser Worpswede (Germany, 2005), Stiftung Künstlerdorf Schöppingen (Germany 2002–2003).

His works have been commissioned and performed by a number of institution including Accademia Nazionale di Santa Cecilia (Rome), Teatro Massimo in Palermo, Teatro dell'Opera di Roma, Teatro Donizetti in Bergamo, Solistes Européens (Luxembourg), Teatro Sociale di Rovigo, ISCM Bucharest, Festival Pergolesi-Spontini (Jesi), Nuova Orchestra Scarlatti (Naples), Progetto Sonora (Cologne), Todi Music Fest (Todi), Klangspectrum (Villach); and they are regularly performed worldwide in contemporary music festivals.

He is the author of incidental music for theatre plays, musical comedies, and film scores since 1983, including works for Henryk Baranowski, Marco Mattolini, Margarethe von Trotta, and Lina Wertmüller.

His works are published by Rai Trade and Suvini Zerboni, and released on CD by CNI, Musicaimmagine, Rai Trade, and Vdm.

He served as president of Rome based Associazione Nuova Consonanza from 2015 to 2021. In January 2025 he has been nominated artistic director of Fondazione Ravello.

== Selected works ==
Stage

- Cara Italia, alfin ti miro (2011) music theatre scene for reciter, soprano, baritone, and ensemble. Libretto by Giorgio Somalvico. 48th Festival Nuova Consonanza, American Academy in Rome, 2011.
- Cenerentola.com (2011) stage opera in two acts for seven singers, children choir, and large orchestra. In collaboration with Nicola Sani, libretto by Albertina Archibugi. Palermo, Teatro Massimo, 2011.
- La Fugitive (2009) stage opera in three acts), for six singers, children chorus, and chember orchestra. Libretto by Daniel Goldenberg. Teatro dell'Opera di Roma, 2009.
- L’ultimo avventore (2007) stage opera in one act, for two singers and chamber orchestra. Libretto by Bruno Cagli. Edizioni Musicali Rai Trade. Rome, Roma Sinfonietta, 2007.
- Il piccolo cantore (2004) stage opera in one act, for six singers, one actor, choir, children’s chorus, and orchestra. Libretto by Ugo Gregoretti. Bergamo, Teatro Gaetano Donizetti, 2005.
- Il Gioco dei Mostri (1999) stage opera in a prologue and two acts, for six singers, one actor, nine instruments. Collaboration with Nicola Sani, Libretto by Paolo Fallai. Rome, Accademia Nazionale di santa Cecilia, Teatro Valle, 1999.
- Una Favola per Caso (1996) stage opera for children in a prologue and two acts, for seven singers, choir, children’s chorus, and orchestra. Collaboration with Nicola Sani, Libretto by Albertina Archibugi. Rovigo, Teatro Sociale, 1997.

Orchestral, choral

- Missa Sancti Johannis Baptistae, in memoriam Johannis Baptistae Pergolesi (2011) for soloists, chorus, two pianos, harmonium. Jesi, 11th Festival Pergolesi Spontini, 2011.
- La Creazione (2008) for reciter and string orchestra, on a poem by Giorgio Somalvico. Bolzano, 2009.
- Tetra (2008) for clarinet, piano and string orchestra. Rome, Accademia Nazionale di Santa Cecilia, Auditorium Parco della Musica, 2008.
- Io corro (2007) for reciter and orchestra, on texts by Dacia Maraini. L’Aquila, Istituzione Sinfonica Abruzzese, 2007.
- Ipocantico (Invocazione in frantumi) (2007) for flute and string orchestra. Assisi, 2007.
- P.A.C.E. (preludio aperto, cantabile, ending) (2006) for orchestra. Scala (Salerno), 2006.
- Cavallo in un’Isola (1999) for reciter and orchestra, on a text by Jacques Prévert. Todi Arte Festival, 1999.

Chamber

- Advice (2010) for mezzo-soprano and guitar, on a text by Tiziana Masucci. 47th Festival Nuova Consonanza, American Academy in Rome, 2010.
- Looking Up (2008) for piano. Münster (Germany), 2009.
- Solitude (2008) for solo amplified viola. Spittal an der Drau (Austria), 2008.
- Trasporto 1941 (2008) for flute and percussion. Rome, Auditorium Parco della Musica – Sala Santa Cecilia, 2008.
- Bicinia (2007–2008) for two sopranos and marimba, on poems by Bruno Cagli. Rome, Vdm Studio, 2008.
- Immaginario connettivo (2007) for string quartet. Bucharest, ISCM Festival, 2008.
- Mundus novus (2006) for flute and piano. Philadelphia, PA, 2007.
- Conseguenze (2003) for flute, violin, live electronics. Cologne, 2003.
- Metatem (2003) for three accordions. Rome, 2003.
