= Scenes from an Execution =

Play written by Howard Barker

- Poster advertising the 1990 production of Scenes from an Execution at the Almeida Theatre, London.
- Written by: Howard Barker
- Original language: English

Scenes from an Execution is a play by the English playwright Howard Barker. The plot revolves around a female artist's struggles against the Venetian city-state in the aftermath of the 16th century Battle of Lepanto. Although the city commissions the painting to celebrate the victory over the Turks, the artist's vision differs dramatically from that of the Doge and the Catholic Church. The play has been described as "Barker's most famous and accessible play".

Originally a radio play for the BBC in 1984 with Glenda Jackson in the role of the artist Galactia, the stage version was first performed in 1990 at the Almeida Theatre in London with Glenda Jackson reprising her role. The play was later revived in 2012 by the National Theatre on its Lyttelton stage with Fiona Shaw and Tim McInnerny starring in this production.

Barker himself has turned against the play. "It's a very easy play to like", he said in 1999, and believed in 2012 that some of his other plays are superior works.

== Productions ==
A fringe production was staged in 2007 at the Hackney Empire.

The play opened Off-Broadway at the Potomac Theatre Project in July 2008, directed by Richard Romagnoli and starring Jan Maxwell as Galactia. Maxwell was nominated for the Drama Desk Award, Outstanding Actress in a Play.

The play was revived in 2012 by National Theatre and performed on the Lyttelton stage. In his review of the National Theatre production, The Guardian critic Michael Billington wrote: "it shows Barker's poetic talent at its most disciplined and has the feel of a contemporary classic."
