= Howard Barker =

British playwright

- Born: 28 June 1946 (age 80); Camberwell, London, England
- Occupations: Playwright, theatre director, poet
- Writing career
- Notable works: Scenes from an Execution, Victory, The Castle, The Possibilities, The Europeans, Arguments for a Theatre, Judith, Gertrude - The Cry

Howard Barker (born 28 June 1946) is a British playwright, screenwriter and writer of radio drama, painter, poet, and essayist, writing predominantly on playwriting and the theatre. The author of an extensive body of dramatic works since the 1970s, he is best known for his plays Scenes from an Execution, Victory, The Castle, The Possibilities, The Europeans, Judith and Gertrude – The Cry as well as being a founding member of, primary playwright for and stage designer for British theatre company The Wrestling School.

== The Theatre of Catastrophe ==
Barker has coined the term "Theatre of Catastrophe" to describe a form of dramatic tragedy he has developed, with him identifying his play The Europeans, written in 1987, as "the first of the Catastrophic plays".

Rejecting the widespread notion that an audience should share a single response to the events onstage, Barker works to fragment response, forcing each viewer to wrestle with the play alone. "We must overcome the urge to do things in unison", he writes. "To chant together, to hum banal tunes together, is not collectivity." Where other playwrights might clarify a scene, Barker seeks to render it more complex, ambiguous, and unstable.

Only through a tragic renaissance, Barker argues, will beauty and poetry return to the stage. "Tragedy liberates language from banality", he asserts. "It returns poetry to speech."

== Themes ==
Barker's plays often explore violence, sexuality, the desire for power, human motivation and the limits of language.

Barker frequently turns to historical events for inspiration. His play Scenes from an Execution, for example, centers on the aftermath of the Battle of Lepanto (1571) and a fictional female artist commissioned to create a commemorative painting of the Venetian victory over the Ottoman fleet. Scenes from an Execution, originally written for BBC Radio 3 and starring Glenda Jackson in 1984, was later adapted for the stage. The short play Judith revolves around the Biblical story of Judith, the legendary heroine who decapitated the invading general Holofernes.

In other plays, Barker has fashioned responses to famous literary works. Brutopia is a challenge to Thomas More's Utopia. Minna is a sardonic work inspired by Gotthold Ephraim Lessing's Enlightenment comedy Minna von Barnhelm. In Uncle Vanya, he poses an alternative vision to Anton Chekhov's drama of the same name. For Barker, Chekhov is a playwright of bad faith, a writer who encourages us to sentimentalize our own weaknesses and glamorize inertia. Beneath Chekhov's celebrated compassion, Barker argues, lies contempt. In his play, Barker has Chekhov walk into Vanya's world and express his disdain for him. "Vanya, I have such a withering knowledge of your soul," says the Russian playwright. "Its pitiful dimensions. It is smaller than an aspirin that fizzles in a glass. . ." However, Chekhov dies, and Vanya finds the resoluteness to stride out of the confines of his creator's world.

Barker's protagonists are conflicted, often perverse, and their motivations appear enigmatic. In A Hard Heart, Riddler, described by the playwright as "A Woman of Originality", is called upon to use her considerable brilliance in fortifications and tactics to save her besieged city. Each choice she makes appears to render the city more vulnerable to attack, but that outcome seems to exhilarate rather than upset her. "My mind was engine-like in its perfection," she exults in the midst of destruction. Barker's heroes are drawn into the heart of the paradoxical, fascinated by contradiction.

The 1995 edition of the encyclopaedic The Cambridge Guide to Theatre describes Barker as a playwright "adept at choosing telling dramatic situations in which many different incidents can take place, but he reverses what might be regarded as the moral expectations [as well as] the expected moral order of capitalist societies. […] Barker deliberately attempts to upset expectations, denying the value of reason, continuity and naturalism, but there is a certain predictability about his wildness. His characters seem to be at emotional extremes, to speak in the same overwrought, rhetorical language."

== Productions ==
Barker has acknowledged he has had greater success as playwright internationally than in his home country of Britain and many of his plays have been translated into other languages. He has noted that his plays have been more successful when performed abroad in America, Australia and Europe, especially mainland Europe where Barker has been celebrated as "one of the major writers of modern European theatre".

In Britain, Barker is "largely unknown" and he has been described as "cut[ting] a Byronic dash in British Theatre – sardonic, detached, the insider's outsider." Barker's work has influenced and inspired a number of notable British playwrights, including Sarah Kane, David Greig, Lucy Kirkwood, and Dennis Kelly. Noted actors Ian McDiarmid and Fiona Shaw have received acclaim for their performances in Barker's plays.

In Britain, Howard Barker formed The Wrestling School Company in 1988 to produce his own work in his native country.

There has been a small flurry of productions of Barker's plays on the London Fringe since 2007, including some non-Wrestling School productions which seem to fare better critically. Notable among these have been Victory and Scenes from An Execution, which received acclaimed productions at the Arcola and the Hackney Empire respectively. In 2012 the National Theatre staged a production of Scenes from an Execution, starring Fiona Shaw and Tim McInnerny.

== Works ==
=== Stage plays ===
- Cheek (1970)
- No One Was Saved (1970) – Script unpublished
- Edward – the Final Days (1972) – Script unpublished
- Alpha Alpha (1972) – Script unpublished
- Faceache (1972) – Script unpublished
- Skipper (1973) – Script unpublished
- My Sister and I (1973) – Script unpublished
- Rule Britannia (1973) – Script unpublished
- Bang (1973) – Script unpublished
- Claw (1975)
- Stripwell (1975)
- Wax (1976) – Script unpublished
- Fair Slaughter (1977)
- That Good Between Us (1977)
- Birth on a Hard Shoulder (1977)
- Downchild (1977)
- The Hang of the Gaol (1978)
- The Love of a Good Man (1978)
- The Loud Boy's Life (1980)
- Crimes in Hot Countries (1980) (also performed as Twice Dead)
- No End of Blame (1981)
- The Poor Man's Friend (1981)
- The Power of the Dog (1981)
- Victory (1983)
- A Passion in Six Days (1983)
- The Castle (1985)
- Women Beware Women, adaptation of Thomas Middleton (1986)
- The Possibilities (1986)
- The Bite of the Night (1986)
- The Europeans (1987)
- The Last Supper (1988)
- Rome (1989)
- Seven Lears(1989)
- Golgo (1989)
- (Uncle) Vanya, adaptation of Chekhov's Uncle Vanya (1991)
- Ten Dilemas in the Life of a God (1992)
- Judith: A Parting from the Body (1992)
- Ego in Arcadia (1992)
- A Hard Heart (1992)
- Minna, adaptation of Lessing's Minna von Barnhelm (1993)
- All He Fears, a specialist play for marionettes (1993)
- The Early Hours of a Reviled Man
- Stalingrad
- 12 Encounters with a Prodigy
- The Twelfth Battle of Isonzo (2001)
- Found in the Ground
- The Swing at Night, a specialist play for marionettes (2001)
- Knowledge and a Girl
- Hated Nightfall and Wounds to the Face (1995)
- The Gaoler's Ache for the Nearly Dead (1997)
- Ursula; Fear of the Estuary (1998)
- Und (1999)
- The Ecstatic Bible (2000) Prizewinner Adelaide International Festival co-production Brink Theatre (SA) and Wrestling School
- He Stumbled (2000)
- A House of Correction (2001)
- Gertrude - The Cry (2002)
- 13 Objects and Summer School (2003)
- Dead Hands (2004)
- The Fence in Its Thousandth Year (2005)
- The Seduction of Almighty God by the Boy Priest Loftus in the Abbey of Calcetto, 1539 (2006)
- Christ's Dog (2006)
- The Forty (Few Words) (2006)
- I Saw Myself (2008)
- The Dying of Today (2008)
- A Wounded Knife (2009)

=== Radio plays ===
- One afternoon on the 63rd level of the north face of the pyramid of Cheops the Great (1970) – Script unpublished.
- Henry V in two parts (1971) – Script unpublished.
- Herman, with Mille and Mick (1972) – Script unpublished.
- Scenes from an Execution (1984)
- The Early Hours of a Reviled Man (1990)
- A Hard Heart (1992)
- A House of Correction (1999)
- Albertina (1999)
- Knowledge and a Girl (2002)
- The Moving and the Still (2003) – Broadcast in 2004.
- The Quick and the Dead, Radio 3 (2004)
- Two skulls, broadcast on Danish radio (2005)
- The Road, The House, The Road (2006) broadcast on Radio 4 to commemorate his sixtieth birthday.
- Let Me (2006) broadcast to commemorate the sixtieth anniversary of the Third Programme (Radio 3)

=== Television plays and films ===
- Cows (1972)
- Made (1972) feature film based on his play No One Was Saved.
- Mutinies (1974)
- The Chauffeur and the Lady (1974)
- Prowling Offensive (1975) – not transmitted
- Conrod
- Aces High (1976) feature film adapted from R.C. Sheriff's play Journey's End.
- Heroes of Labour (1976) – unproduced
- All Bleeding (1976) – unproduced
- Credentials of a Sympathiser (1976)
- Sympathiser (1977) – unproduced
- Russia (1977) – unproduced
- Heaven (1978) – unproduced
- Pity in History (1984)
- The Blow, film (1985)
- Brutopia (1989)
- Christ's Dog (2011) short film adapted from his play of the same name.
- In Mid Wickedness (2013) short film in the Georgian language adapted from his play The Forty.
- Not Him (2014) short film based on Barker's short play of the same name from The Possibilities.
- Don't Exaggerate (2015) short film adapted from Howard Barker's work of the same name.

=== Other writings ===
Barker has also authored several volumes of poetry (Don't Exaggerate, The Breath of the Crowd, Gary the Thief, Lullabies for the Impatient, The Ascent of Monte Grappa, and The Tortman Diaries), an opera (Terrible Mouth with music by Nigel Osborne), the text for Flesh and Blood, a dramatic scene for two singers and orchestra by David Sawer, and three collections of writings on the theatre (Arguments for a Theatre, Death, The One and The Art of Theatre, A Style And Its Origins).

== Personal life ==
Barker divorced in the 1980s and has lived on his own in Brighton since then.
