= The Wrestling School =

British theatre company

The Wrestling School is a British theatre company, founded and led by playwright Howard Barker.

== Company history ==
Founded in 1988 by actors from the Royal Shakespeare Company and the Royal Court Theatre, the company has exclusively presented productions of Barker's plays. A touring company, The Wrestling School is based in London and played a range of Off West End venues to premiere their productions, including the Arcola Theatre and Riverside Studios. Coproducers have included the Birmingham REP, the Elsinore Hamlet Summer Festival, Exeter University and the Northcott Theatre.

In their review of The Wrestling School's production of Judith, The Independent wrote "the Wrestling School are the most important buildingless company in Britain."
