= Chichester Festival production history =

Chronological list of Chichester Festival Theatre productions

Chichester Festival Theatre, located in Chichester, England, is one of the United Kingdom's flagship theatres with an international reputation for quality and innovation. The following is a chronological list of the Chichester Festival production history of productions that have been staged since its inception.

== 1960s ==
1962

- The Chances by John Fletcher, directed by Laurence Olivier
- The Broken Heart by John Ford, directed by Laurence Olivier
- Uncle Vanya by Anton Chekhov, translation by Constance Garnett, directed by Laurence Olivier

1963

- Saint Joan by George Bernard Shaw, directed by John Dexter
- Uncle Vanya by Anton Chekhov, translation by Constance Garnett, directed by Laurence Olivier
- The Workhouse Donkey by John Arden, directed by Stuart Burge

1964

- The Royal Hunt of the Sun by Peter Shaffer, directed by John Dexter
- The Dutch Courtesan by John Marston, directed by William Gaskill
- Othello by William Shakespeare, directed by John Dexter

1965

- Armstrong's Last Goodnight by John Arden, directed by John Dexter and William Gaskill
- Trelawny of the "Wells" by Arthur Wing Pinero, directed by Desmond O'Donovan
- Miss Julie by August Strindberg, translation by Michael Meyer, directed by Michael Elliott
- Black Comedy by Peter Shaffer, directed by John Dexter

1966

- The Clandestine Marriage by George Colman and David Garrick, directed by Desmond O'Donovan
- The Fighting Cock by Jean Anouilh, translation by Lucienne Hill, directed by Norman Marshall
- The Cherry Orchard by Anton Chekhov, translation by John Murrell, directed by Lindsay Anderson
- Macbeth by William Shakespeare, directed by Michael Benthall

1967

- The Farmer's Wife by Eden Phillpotts, directed by John Clements
- The Beaux' Stratagem by George Farquhar, directed by William Chappell
- Heartbreak House by George Bernard Shaw, directed by John Clements
- The Italian Straw Hat by Eugène Labiche, translation by Theodore Hoffmann, directed by Peter Coe

1968

- The Unknown Soldier and His Wife written and directed by Peter Ustinov
- The Cocktail Party by T. S. Eliot, directed by Alec Guinness
- The Tempest by William Shakespeare, directed by David Jones
- The Skin of Our Teeth by Thornton Wilder, directed by Peter Coe

1969

- The Caucasian Chalk Circle by Bertolt Brecht, translation by James and Tania Stern with W. H. Auden, directed by Peter Coe
- The Magistrate by Arthur Wing Pinero, directed by John Clements
- The Country Wife by William Wycherley, directed by Robert Chetwyn
- Antony and Cleopatra by William Shakespeare, directed by Peter Dews

== 1970s ==
1970

- Peer Gynt by Henrik Ibsen, English version by Christopher Fry based on a translation by Johann Fillinger, directed by Peter Coe
- Vivat! Vivat Regina! by Robert Bolt, directed by Peter Dews
- Double bill: The Proposal by Anton Chekhov, translation by Constance Garnett, and Arms and the Man by George Bernard Shaw. Directed by John Clements
- The Alchemist by Ben Jonson, directed by Peter Dews

1971

- The Rivals by Richard Brinsley Sheridan, directed by John Clements
- Dear Antoine by Jean Anouilh, translated by Lucienne Hill, directed by Robin Phillips
- Caesar and Cleopatra by George Bernard Shaw, directed by Robin Phillips
- Reunion in Vienna by Robert E. Sherwood, directed by Frith Banbury

1972

- The Beggar's Opera by John Gay, directed by Robin Phillips
- The Doctor's Dilemma by George Bernard Shaw, directed by John Clements
- The Taming of the Shrew by William Shakespeare, directed by Jonathan Miller
- The Lady's Not for Burning by Christopher Fry, directed by Robin Phillips

1973

- The Director of the Opera by Jean Anouilh, translated by Lucienne Hill, directed by Peter Dews
- The Seagull by Anton Chekhov, directed by Jonathan Miller
- R Loves J by Peter Ustinov, music by Alexander Faris, lyrics by Julian More, directed by Wendy Toye
- Dandy Dick by Arthur Wing Pinero, directed by John Clements

1974

- Tonight We Improvise by Luigi Pirandello, translated by Samuel Putnam, directed by Peter Coe
- The Confederacy by John Vanbrugh, directed by Wendy Toye
- Oedipus Tyrannus by Sophocles, adapted by Gail Rademacher, directed by Hovhannes Pilikian
- A Month in the Country by Ivan Turgenev, translated by Adriane Nicolaeff, directed by Toby Robinson

1975

- Cyrano de Bergerac by Edmond Rostand, translated by Christopher Fry, directed by José Ferrer
- An Enemy of the People by Henrik Ibsen, English version by John Patrick Vincent, directed by Patrick Garland
- Made in Heaven by Andrew Sachs, directed by Wendy Toye
- Othello by William Shakespeare, directed by Peter Dews

1976

- Noah by André Obey, English text by Arthur Wilmurt, directed by Eric Thompson
- Twelfth Night by William Shakespeare, directed by Keith Michell
- The Circle by W. Somerset Maugham, directed by Peter Dews
- Monsieur Perrichon's Travels by Eugène Labiche & Edouard Martin, English version by R.H. Ward, directed by Patrick Garland

1977

- Waters of the Moon by N.C. Hunter, directed by John Clements
- In Order of Appearance by Wally K. Daly & Keith Michell, music by Jim Parker, directed by Keith Michell
- Julius Caesar by William Shakespeare, directed by Peter Dews
- The Apple Cart by George Bernard Shaw, directed by Patrick Garland

1978

- A Woman of No Importance by Oscar Wilde, directed by Patrick Garland
- The Inconstant Couple by Pierre de Marivaux, translated and adapted by John Bowen, directed by Noel Willman
- The Aspern Papers by Henry James, adapted for the theatre by Michael Redgrave, directed by David William
- Look After Lulu! by Noël Coward, based on Occupe-toi d'Amélie! by Georges Feydeau, directed by Patrick Garland

1979

- The Devil's Disciple by George Bernard Shaw, directed by Peter Dews
- The Eagle Has Two Heads by Jean Cocteau, adapted by Ronald Duncan, directed by David William
- The Importance of Being Earnest by Oscar Wilde, directed by Peter Dews
- The Man Who Came to Dinner by Moss Hart and George S. Kaufman, directed by Patrick Lau

== 1980s ==
1980

- The Last of Mrs Cheyney by Frederick Lonsdale, directed by Patrick Lau
- Terra Nova by Ted Tally, directed by Peter Dews
- Much Ado About Nothing by William Shakespeare, directed by Peter Dews
- Old Heads and Young Hearts by Dion Boucicault, adapted by Peter Sallis, directed by Michael Simpson

1981

- The Cherry Orchard by Anton Chekhov, translated by David Magarshack, revised by Philip Roth, directed by Patrick Garland
- Feasting with Panthers, devised and directed by Peter Coe
- The Mitford Girls by Caryl Brahms & Ned Sherrin, music by Peter Greenwell, directed by Patrick Garland
- Underneath the Arches by Patrick Garland, Brian Glanville & Roy Hudd, directed by Roger Redfarn

1982

- On the Rocks by George Bernard Shaw, directed by Jack Emery and Patrick Garland
- Valmouth by Sandy Wilson, from the novel by Ronald Firbank, directed by John Dexter
- Cavell by Keith Baxter, directed by Patrick Garland
- Goodbye, Mr. Chips, based on the novel by James Hilton, book by Roland Starke, music & lyrics by Leslie Bricusse, directed by Patrick Garland and Chris Selbie

1983

- A Patriot for Me by John Osborne, directed by Ronald Eyre
- Time and the Conways by J. B. Priestley, directed by Peter Dews
- As You Like It by William Shakespeare, directed by Patrick Garland
- The Sleeping Prince by Terence Rattigan, directed by Peter Coe

1984

- Forty Years On by Alan Bennett, directed by Patrick Garland
- Oh, Kay!, music by George Gershwin, lyrics by Ira Gershwin, book by Tony Geiss & Ned Sherrin, based on the original by Guy Bolton & P.G. Wodehouse, directed by Ian Judge
- The Merchant of Venice by William Shakespeare, directed by Patrick Garland
- The Way of the World by William Congreve, directed by William Gaskill

1985

- Cavalcade by Noël Coward, directed by David Gilmore
- Antony and Cleopatra by William Shakespeare, directed by Robin Phillips
- The Philanthropist by Christopher Hampton, directed by Patrick Garland
- The Scarlet Pimpernel by Baroness Orczy, revised by Beverley Cross, directed by Nicholas Hytner

1986

- Annie Get Your Gun, music & lyrics by Irving Berlin, book by Herbert & Dorothy Fields, directed by David Gilmore
- The Chalk Garden by Enid Bagnold, directed by Ronald Eyre
- The Relapse by John Vanbrugh, directed by Matthew Francis
- Jane Eyre by Charlotte Brontë, adapted for the stage and directed by Peter Coe
- A Funny Thing Happened on the Way to the Forum, book by Burt Shevelove & Larry Gelbart, music and lyrics by Stephen Sondheim, directed by Larry Gelbart

1987

- Robert and Elizabeth, book & lyrics by Ronald Millar, music by Ron Grainer, directed by Stewart Taylor
- An Ideal Husband by Oscar Wilde, directed by Tony Britton
- A Man for All Seasons by Robert Bolt, directed by Frank Hauser
- Miranda by Beverley Cross, after Carlo Goldoni, directed by Wendy Toye

1988

- Hay Fever by Noël Coward, directed by Tony Britton
- Major Barbara by George Bernard Shaw, directed by Christopher Morahan
- The Royal Baccarat Scandal by Royce Ryton, based on the book by Michael Havers & Edward Grayson, directed by Val May
- Ring Round the Moon by Jean Anouilh, translated by Christopher Fry, directed by Elijah Morrissey

1989

- Victory! adapted from Thomas Hardy's The Dynasts by Patrick Garland, directed by Patrick Garland and Matthew Francis
- The Heiress by Ruth and Augustus Goetz, directed by Vivian Matalan
- London Assurance by Dion Boucicault, directed by Sam Mendes
- A Little Night Music, book by Hugh Wheeler, music & lyrics by Stephen Sondheim, directed by Ian Judge
- Summerfolk by Maxim Gorky in a version by Botho Strauss & Peter Stein, translated by Michael Robinson
- Culture Vultures by Robin Glendinning
- Warrior by Shirley Gee
- The Triumph of Love by Pierre de Marivaux, translated by Guy Callan
- Cloud Nine by Caryl Churchill
- Love's Labour's Lost by William Shakespeare
- The Purity Game by Gillian Plowman, music by Corin Buckeridge, lyrics by Will Cohu
- War and Peaces, a revue devised by Will Cohu and Stefan Bednarczyk

== 1990s ==
1990

- The Merry Wives of Windsor by William Shakespeare, directed by Michael Rudman
- The Power and the Glory, adapted by Denis Cannan from the novel by Graham Greene, directed by Tim Luscombe
- The Silver King by Henry Arthur Jones and Henry Herman, directed by Peter Wood
- Rumours by Neil Simon, directed by Michael Rudman
- Born Again, music by Jason Carr, libretto by Julian Barry & Peter Hall, based on the play Rhinoceros by Eugène Ionesco, directed by Peter Hall
- Thérèse Raquin by Émile Zola, translation by Nicholas Wright, directed by David Leveaux
- Eurydice by Jean Anouilh, translated by Peter Meyer, directed by Michael Rudman
- 70, Girls, 70, book by David Thompson & Norman L. Martin, music by John Kander, lyrics by Fred Ebb, based on the play Breath of Spring by Peter Coke, adapted by Joe Masteroff, directed by Paul Kerryson
- My Mother Said I Never Should by Charlotte Keatley, directed by Annie Castledine
- Scenes from a Marriage by Ingmar Bergman, translated by Alan Blair, directed by Rita Russek

1991

- Arsenic and Old Lace by Joseph Kesselring, directed by Annie Castledine
- Henry VIII by William Shakespeare, directed by Ian Judge
- Tovarich directed by Patrick Garland
- Preserving Mr Panmure directed by Peter Wood
- Point Valaine by Noël Coward, directed by Tim Luscombe
- The Sisterhood directed by Tony Britton
- Valentine's Day directed by Gillian Lynne
- Adam was a Gardener directed by Caroline Sharman
- Talking Heads directed by Alan Bennett

1992

- Coriolanus by William Shakespeare, directed by Tim Supple
- Venus Observed directed by James Roose Evans
- King Lear in New York directed by Patrick Garland
- She Stoops to Conquer by Oliver Goldsmith, directed by Peter Wood
- Me and My Girl directed by Ian Rickson
- Double Take directed by Hugh Wooldridge
- Nijinsky - Death of a Faun directed by Jane McCulloch
- Vita & Virginia directed by Patrick Garland
- Cain directed by Edward Hall

1993

- Getting Married by George Bernard Shaw, directed by Tim Supple
- Relative Values by Noël Coward, directed by Tim Luscombe
- Pickwick directed by Patrick Garland
- The Matchmaker by Thornton Wilder, directed by Patrick Mason
- Carrington directed by Annie Castledine
- Rope directed by Keith Baxter
- Elvira '40 directed by Patrick Garland

1994

- The Rivals by Richard Brinsley Sheridan, directed by Richard Cottrell
- Pygmalion by George Bernard Shaw, directed by Patrick Garland
- The Schoolmistress directed by Matthew Francis
- Noel/Cole: Let's Do It directed by Jeff Thacker and David Kernan
- A Doll's House directed by Annie Castledine
- Dangerous Corner by J. B. Priestley, directed by Keith Baxter
- Three Sisters by Anton Chekhov, directed by Lisa Forellp

1995

- Hadrian the Seventh by Peter Luke, directed by Terry Hands
- Hobson's Choice by Harold Brighouse, directed by Frank Hauser
- The School for Scandal by Richard Brinsley Sheridan, directed by Richard Cottrell
- The Miser by Molière, directed by Nicholas Broadhurst
- The Visit by Friedrich Dürrenmatt, directed by Terry Hands
- Taking Sides by Ronald Harwood, directed by Harold Pinter
- A Word from Our Sponsor directed by Alan Ayckbourn
- Playing the Wife directed by Richard Clifford
- The Hothouse by Harold Pinter, directed by David Jones
- Monsieur Amilcar directed by Tim Luscombe

1996

- Love for Love by William Congreve, directed by Ian Judge
- Mansfield Park directed by Michael Rudman
- Beethoven's 10th directed by Joe Harmston
- When We Are Married by J. B. Priestley, directed by Jude Kelly
- Fortune's Fool directed by Gale Edwards
- Simply Disconnected directed by Richard Wilson
- Talking Heads directed by Alan Bennett
- Uncle Vanya by Anton Chekhov, directed by Bill Bryden
- Hedda Gabler by Henrik Ibsen, directed by Lindy Davies
- Beatrix directed by Patrick Garland
- The Handyman directed by Christopher Morahan
- It Could Be Any One Of Us directed by Alan Ayckbourn

1997

- The Admirable Crichton by J. M. Barrie, directed by Michael Rudman
- Lady Windermere's Fan by Oscar Wilde, directed by Richard Cottrell
- Blithe Spirit by Noël Coward,
- Our Betters directed by Michael Rudman
- The Magistrate by Arthur Wing Pinero, directed by Nicholas Broadhurst
- After October directed by Keith Baxter
- Nocturne for Lovers directed by Kado Kostzer
- Tallulah directed by Michael Rudman
- Suzanna Andler directed by Lindy Davies
- Misalliance by George Bernard Shaw, directed by Frank Hauser
- Electra by Sophocles, directed by David Leveaux

1998

- Saturday, Sunday ... and Monday directed by Jude Kelly
- Racing Demon Christopher Morahan
- Chimes at Midnight directed by Patrick Garland
- Katherine Howard
- Loot directed by David Grindley
- Song of Singapore directed by Roger Redfarn
- The Glass Menagerie by Tennessee Williams, directed by Jacob Murray

1999

- The Importance of Being Earnest by Oscar Wilde, directed by Christopher Morahan
- Semi-Detached by David Turner, directed by Christopher Morahan
- Easy Virtue by Noël Coward, directed by Maria Aitken
- The Man Who Came to Dinner by Moss Hart and George S. Kaufman, directed by Joe Dowling
- The King of Prussia directed by Sean Holmes
- Insignificance directed by Loveday Ingram
- Nymph Errant music and lyrics by Cole Porter, libretto by Romney Brent, from the novel by James Laver, directed by Roger Redfarn
- The School of Night directed by Jack Shepherd
- The Retreat from Moscow directed by Christopher Morahan

== 2000s ==
2000

- The Recruiting Officer directed by James Kerr
- Heartbreak House by George Bernard Shaw, directed by Christopher Morahan
- A Small Family Business
- Arcadia directed by Peter Wood
- The Sea directed by Sean Holmes
- The Blue Room directed by Loveday Ingram
- Pal Joey music by Richard Rodgers, lyrics by Lorenz Hart, book by John O'Hara, directed by Loveday Ingram
- Aristocrats directed by Sean Holmes
- Hysteria directed by Loveday Ingram

2001

- On the Razzle directed by Peter Wood
- The Winslow Boy directed by Christopher Morahan
- My One and Only directed by Loveday Ingram
- Three Sisters by Anton Chekhov, directed by Loveday Ingram
- Song of Singapore directed by Roger Redfarn
- Shang-a-Lang directed by Andy Brereton
- In Celebration directed by Sean Holmes
- The Secret Rapture directed by Indhu Rubasingham
- Pulling It Together directed by Edward Hall
- Alice's Adventures directed by Dale Rooks

2002

- The Front Page by Ben Hecht and Charles MacArthur, directed by Edward Kemp
- Wild Orchids directed by Edward Kemp
- Cabaret book by Joe Masteroff, lyrics by Fred Ebb, music by John Kander, directed by Roger Redfarn
- Romeo and Juliet by William Shakespeare, directed by Indhu Rubasingham
- The Lady's Not for Burning directed by Samuel West
- Up on the Roof directed by Angus Jackson
- Blunt Speaking directed by Mark Clements
- Songs of the Western Men directed by Andy Brereton
- Dead Funny directed by Loveday Ingram

2003

- The Gondoliers music by Arthur Sullivan, libretto by W. S. Gilbert, directed by Martin Duncan
- The Merchant of Venice by William Shakespeare, directed by Gale Edwards
- The Waterbabies music and lyrics by Jason Carr, book by Gary Yershon – directed by Jeremy Sams
- The Seagull by Anton Chekhov, directed by Steven Pimlott
- Nathan the Wise directed by Steven Pimlott
- Holes in the Skin directed by Simon Usher
- The Coffee House directed by Simon Gonella
- I Caught My Death in Venice directed by Martin Duncan
- Pinocchio by Brian Way, directed by Dale Rooks

2004

- Out of This World directed by Martin Duncan
- A Midsummer Night's Dream by William Shakespeare, directed by Gale Edwards
- Just So directed by Anthony Drewe
- The Master and Margarita translation by Edward Kemp – directed by Steven Pimlott
- Seven Doors by Botho Strauß, translated by Jeremy Sams – directed by Martin Duncan
- Cruel and Tender directed by Luc Bondy
- Three Women and a Piano Tuner directed by Samuel West
- Doctor Faustus directed by Martin Duncan, Edward Kemp and Dale Rooks

2005

- How to Succeed in Business Without Really Trying directed by Martin Duncan
- Scapino, or The Trickster directed by Silviu Pucarete
- The Government Inspector by Nikolai Gogol, directed by Martin Duncan
- 5/11 by Edward Kemp – directed by Steven Pimlott
- Six Pictures of Lee Miller Music and lyrics by Jason Carr, book by Edward Kemp – directed by Anthony Van Laast
- King Lear by William Shakespeare, directed by Steven Pimlott
- The Scarlet Letter directed by Phyllis Nagy
- Arabian Nights directed by Dale Rooks

2006

- Entertaining Angels directed by Alan Strachan
- Carousel by Richard Rodgers and Oscar Hammerstein II, directed by Angus Jackson
- The Life and Adventures of Nicholas Nickleby parts 1 & 2 directed by Jonathan Church and Philip Franks
- Pravda directed by Jonathan Church
- Peter Pan directed by Dale Rooks
- In Praise of Love directed by Philip Wilson
- Tonight at 8.30 Parts I & II directed by Lucy Bailey
- The Father directed by Angus Jackson
- Grimm Tales directed by Dale Rooks

2007

- The Last Confession directed by David Jones
- Babes in Arms by Richard Rodgers and Lorenz Hart, directed by Martin Connor
- Twelfth Night by William Shakespeare, directed by Philip Franks
- Hobson's Choice directed by Jonathan Church
- The Life and Adventures of Nicholas Nickleby parts 1 & 2 directed by Jonathan Church and Philip Franks
- James and the Giant Peach directed by Dale Rooks
- Office Suite directed by Edward Kemp
- Macbeth by William Shakespeare, directed by Rupert Goold
- The Waltz of the Toreadors by Jean Anouilh, translated by Lucienne Hill, directed by Lindsay Posner
- I am Shakespeare directed by Matthew Warchus and Mark Rylance

2008

- The Cherry Orchard by Anton Chekhov directed by Philip Franks
- The Music Man by Meredith Willson directed by Rachel Kavanaugh
- The Circle by Somerset Maugham directed by Jonathan Church
- Calendar Girls by Tim Firth directed by Hamish McColl
- Funny Girl by Isobel Lennart directed by Angus Jackson
- Six Characters in Search of an Author by Luigi Pirandello directed by Rupert Goold
- Taking Sides by Ronald Harwood directed by Philip Franks
- Collaboration by Ronald Harwood directed by Philip Franks
- Aristo by Martin Sherman directed by Nancy Meckler

2009

- The Last Cigarette by Simon Gray and Hugh Whitemore directed by Richard Eyre
- Hay Fever by Noël Coward directed by Nikolai Foster
- Taking Sides by Ronald Harwood directed by Philip Franks
- Collaboration by Ronald Harwood directed by Philip Franks
- Cyrano de Bergerac by Edmond Rostand directed by Trevor Nunn
- Wallenstein by Friedrich Schiller directed by Angus Jackson
- Oklahoma! by Rodgers & Hammerstein directed by John Doyles
- The House of Special Purpose by Heidi Thomas directed by Howard Davies
- The Grapes of Wrath by John Steinbeck, adapted by Frank Galati directed by Jonathan Church
- ENRON by Lucy Prebble directed by Rupert Goold
- Separate Tables by Terence Rattigan directed by Philip Franks

== 2010s ==
2010

- Bingo by Edward Bond directed by Angus Jackson
- Yes, Prime Minister by Antony Jay and Jonathan Lynn directed by Jonathan Lynn
- Love Story by Erich Segal music by Howard Goodall directed by Rachel Kavanaugh
- 42nd Street music by Harry Warren directed by Paul Kerryson
- The Critic and The Real Inspector Hound by Richard Brinsley Sheridan and Tom Stoppard directed by Jonathan Church
- Pygmalion by George Bernard Shaw directed by Philip Prowse
- The Ragged-Trousered Philanthropists by Robert Tressell directed by Christopher Morahan
- The Master Builder by Henrik Ibsen directed by Philip Franks
- Enron by Lucy Prebble directed by Rupert Goold
- A Month In The Country by Ivan Turgenev directed by Jonathan Kent
- The Firework-Maker's Daughter by Philip Pullman directed by Dale Rooks

2011

- Rosencrantz and Guildenstern Are Dead by Tom Stoppard
- Singin' in the Rain book by Betty Comden and Adolph Green, lyrics by Arthur Freed, and music by Nacio Herb Brown
- The Deep Blue Sea by Terence Rattigan
- Rattigan's Nijinsky by Nicholas Wright
- Sweeney Todd music and lyrics by Stephen Sondheim and libretto by Hugh Wheeler
- She Loves Me book by Joe Masteroff, lyrics by Sheldon Harnick, and music by Jerry Bock
- Top Girls by Caryl Churchill
- The Syndicate by Eduardo De Filippo, in a new version by Mike Poulton
- South Downs by David Hare

2012

- Uncle Vanya – by Anton Chekhov
- The Way of the World – by William Congreve
- A Marvellous Year for Plums by Hugh Whitemore
- Canvas by Michael Wynne
- Kiss Me, Kate – book by Samuel and Bella Spewack – music and lyrics by Cole Porter
- The Resistible Rise of Arturo Ui – by Bertolt Brecht
- Heartbreak House by George Bernard Shaw
- Noah by Rachel Barnett
- Surprises by Alan Ayckbourn
- Absurd Person Singular by Alan Ayckbourn
- Private Lives – by Noël Coward
- Antony and Cleopatra – by William Shakespeare

2013

- The Pajama Game – music by Richard Adler and Jerry Ross
- If Only – by David Edgar
- Barnum – by Mark Bramble, lyrics by Michael Stewart, music by Cy Coleman
- The Resistible Rise of Arturo Ui – by Bertolt Brecht
- Neville's Island – by Tim Firth
- Another Country – by Julian Mitchell
- The Witches – by Roald Dahl

2014

- Stevie – by Hugh Whitemore
- Pressure – by David Haig
- Miss Julie – by August Strindberg, in a new version by Rebecca Lenkiewicz
- Black Comedy – by Peter Shaffer
- Amadeus – by Peter Shaffer
- Guys and Dolls – music and lyrics by Frank Loesser book by Jo Swerling and Abe Burrows
- Taken at Midnight – by Mark Hayhurst
- Gypsy – book by Arthur Laurents music by Jule Styne lyrics by Stephen Sondheim
- Frankie and Johnny in the Clair de Lune – by Terrence McNally
- An Ideal Husband – by Oscar Wilde
- The Hundred and One Dalmatians – by Dodie Smith in a new adaptation by Bryony Lavery

2015

- Way Upstream – by Alan Ayckbourn
- Educating Rita – by Willy Russell
- The Rehearsal – by Jean Anouilh, in a new adaptation by Jeremy Sams
- Mack and Mabel
- For Services Rendered – by Somerset Maugham
- Someone Who'll Watch Over Me – by Frank McGuinness
- A Damsel in Distress – based on a novel by P. G. Wodehouse, with songs by George and Ira Gershwin
- Young Chekhov trilogy – Platonov, Ivanov and The Seagull

2016

- Travels with My Aunt – based on the novel by Graham Greene, book by Ron Cowen and Daniel Lipman, music and lyrics by George Stiles and Anthony Drewe
- An Enemy of the People – by Henrik Ibsen, in a version by Christopher Hampton
- Ross – by Terence Rattigan
- First Light – a new play by Mark Hayhurst
- Fracked! Or: Please Don't Use the F-Word – a new play by Alistair Beaton
- Half a Sixpence – book by Julian Fellowes, new music and lyrics by George Stiles and Anthony Drewe, original songs by David Heneker
- Strife – by John Galsworthy
- This House – by James Graham
- Much Ado About Nothing and Love's Labour's Lost – by William Shakespeare

2017

- Forty Years On – by Alan Bennett
- Caroline, or Change – book and lyrics by Tony Kushner, music by Jeanine Tesori
- Sweet Bird of Youth – by Tennessee Williams
- The Country Girls – by Edna O'Brien
- Fiddler on the Roof – book by Joseph Stein, music by Jerry Bock, lyrics by Sheldon Harnick
- The House They Grew Up In – a new play by Deborah Bruce
- Grimm Tales – For Young and Old – Chichester Festival Youth Theatre
- The Stepmother – by Githa Sowerby
- The Norman Conquests – a trilogy of plays – Table Manners, Living Together, Round and Round the Garden – by Alan Ayckbourn
- King Lear – by William Shakespeare
- Quiz – a new play by James Graham
- Beauty and the Beast – Chichester Festival Youth Theatre

2018

- Present Laughter – by Noël Coward
- random/generations – by Debbie Tucker Green
- The Chalk Garden – by Enid Bagnold
- The Country Wife – by William Wycherley
- Me and My Girl – book and lyrics by L Arthur Rose and Douglas Furber, book revised by Stephen Fry with contributions by Mike Ockrent, music by Noel Gay
- The Meeting – by Charlotte Jones
- Copenhagen - by Michael Frayn
- Flowers For Mrs Harris – based on the novel by Paul Gallico, book by Rachel Wagstaff, music and lyrics by Richard Taylor
- Cock – by Mike Bartlett
- The Midnight Gang – by David Walliams, adapted by Bryony Lavery, music and lyrics by Joe Stilgoe
- The Watsons – by Laura Wade, adapted from the unfinished novel by Jane Austen
- Sleeping Beauty – by Rufus Norris – Chichester Festival Youth Theatre

2019

- This Is My Family – a musical by Tim Firth
- Shadowlands – by William Nicholson
- Plenty – by David Hare
- The Deep Blue Sea – by Terence Rattigan
- Oklahoma! – music by Richard Rodgers, book and lyrics by Oscar Hammerstein II, based on the play Green Grow the Lilacs by Lynn Riggs
- 8 Hotels – a new play by Nicholas Wright
- Crossing Lines – a new play by Anna Ledwich
- Hedda Tessman – by Cordelia Lynn after Henrik Ibsen
- Macbeth – by William Shakespeare
- Sing Yer Heart Out For The Lads – by Roy Williams
- The Butterfly Lion – by Michael Morpurgo, a new adaptation by Anna Ledwich
- The Wizard of Oz – by L. Frank Baum with music and Lyrics of the MGM motion picture score by Harold Arlen and E. Y. Harburg. Background music by Herbert Stothart. Dance and vocal arrangements by Peter Howard. Adapted by John Kane from the motion picture screenplay. – Chichester Festival Youth Theatre

== 2020s ==
2020 (Cancelled due to the COVID-19 pandemic)

2021

- South Pacific – music by Richard Rogers, lyrics by Oscar Hammerstein II, book by Oscar Hammerstein II and Joshua Logan, Adapted from Tales of the South Pacific by James A. Michener
- The Flock – a new play by Zoe Cooper
- The Beauty Queen of Leenane – by Martin McDonagh
- The Long Song – A new adaptation by Suhayla El-Bushra, Based on the novel by Andrea Levy
- Home – by David Storey
- Pinocchio – A new adaptation by Anna Ledwich, Music by Tom Brady, From the original novel The Adventures of Pinocchio by Carlo Collodi – Chichester Festival Youth Theatre

2022

- The Taxidermist's Daughter – adapted for the stage by Kate Mosse, a new play based on her novel
- Our Generation – a new play by Alecky Blythe
- Murder on the Orient Express – by Agatha Christie, adapted for the stage by Ken Ludwig
- The Unfriend – a new play by Steven Moffat
- The Southbury Child – a new play by Stephen Beresford
- Crazy for You - music & lyrics by George & Ira Gershwin, book by Ken Ludwig
- Sing Yer Heart Out For The Lads – by Roy Williams
- The Narcissist – a new play by Christopher Shinn
- Woman in Mind – by Alan Ayckbourn
- Local Hero – book by David Greig, music and lyrics by Mark Knopfler, based on the Bill Forsyth film
- The Famous Five – music and lyrics by Theo Jamieson, book by Elinor Cook, based on the books by Enid Blyton
- The Wind in the Willows – by Kenneth Grahame, adapted for the stage by Alan Bennett, music and additional lyrics by Jeremy Sams – Chichester Festival Theatre

2023

- The Vortex - by Noël Coward
- 4000 Miles - by Amy Herzog
- Assassins - music and lyrics by Stephen Sondheim, book by John Weidman
- Mom, How Did You Meet The Beatles? - by Adrienne Kennedy and Adam P. Kennedy
- The Sound of Music - music by Richard Rodgers, lyrics by Oscar Hammerstein II, book by Howard Lindsay and Russel Crouse
- Rock Follies - book by Chloe Moss, lyrics by Howard Schuman, music by Andy Mackay
- A Midsummer Night's Dream - by William Shakespeare
- Never Have I Ever - by Deborah Frances-White
- Quiz - by James Graham
- A View from the Bridge - by Arthur Miller
- The Inquiry - by Harry Davies
- The Jungle Book - by Rudyard Kipling, adapted by Sonali Bhattacharyya

2024

- The Other Boleyn Girl by Mike Poulton, based on the novel by Philippa Gregory
- The House Party by Laura Lomas, an adaptation of Miss Julie by August Strindberg
- Coram Boy by Helen Edmundson, based on the novel by Jamila Gavin
- The Caretaker by Harold Pinter
- Oliver! - Book, Music and Lyrics by Lionel Bart, freely adapted from Charles Dickens' Oliver Twist, new revision by Cameron Mackintosh
- The Promise by Paul Unwin
- John le Carre's The Spy Who Came In From The Cold adapted for the stage by David Eldridge
- Redlands by Charlotte Jones
- The Cat and the Canary adapted by Carl Grose, from the play by John Willard

2025

- The Government Inspector by Nikolai Gogol, in a new adaptation by Phil Porter
- The Unlikely Pilgrimage of Harold Fry - based on the novel by Rachel Joyce, music and lyrics by Passenger, book by Rachel Joyce
- Anna Karenina by Leo Tolstoy, a new adaptation by Phillip Breen
- Marie and Rosetta by George Brant
- Top Hat - music and lyrics by Irving Berlin, based on RKO's motion picture, adapted for the stage by Matthew White and Howard Jaques
- Choir by Gurpreet Kaur Bhatti
- Hamlet by William Shakespeare
- Lord of the Flies by William Golding, adapted for the stage by Nigel Williams
- Safe Space by Jamie Bogyo
- The Three Little Pigs - music by George Stiles, lyrics and book by Anthony Drewe
- A Boy Called Christmas by Matt Haig, adapted for the stage by Phillip Wilson, music by Tom Brady, lyrics by Phillip Wilson and Tom Brady

2026

- The BFG by Roald Dahl, adapted for the stage by Tom Wells with additional material by Jenny Worton
- Magic by David Haig
- Eclipse by John Morton
- Atonement by Ian McEwan, adapted for the stage by Christopher Hampton
- 45 Years from the film by Andrew Haigh, adapted for the stage by Hannah Patterson
- My Fair Lady - book and lyrics by Alan Jay Lerner, music by Frederick Loewe, adapted from George Bernard Shaw's play Pygmalion
- Atlantis by Emily White
- a small and quiet light by Stephanie Street
- A Midsummer Night's Dream by William Shakespeare
- Antigone Exits by Nina Segal
- Hey! Christmas Tree by Vicki Berwick from a poem by Michael Morpurgo, music and lyrics by Eamon O'Dwyer
- Peter Pan: A Musical Adventure, music by George Stiles, lyrics by Anthony Drewe in a new version by Anthony Drewe from the book by Willis Hall, adapted from J. M. Barrie's original play.
