= Martin Duncan =

British stage director (born 1948)

- Duncan in 2026
- Born: Martin David Anson Duncan; 12 July 1948 (age 78); Chelsea, London, England
- Education: Durston House School; Westminster School; London Academy of Music and Dramatic Art
- Occupations: Theatre director; manager; actor; composer; choreographer
- Years active: 1968–present
- Relatives: Sir George Anson (great-great-great grandfather)
- Website: martinduncan.com

Martin David Anson Duncan (born 12 July 1948) is an English director, actor, composer, and choreographer. Duncan was artistic director of Nottingham Playhouse from 1994 to 1999 and joint artistic director of Chichester Festival Theatre from 2003 to 2005 with Ruth Mackenzie and Steven Pimlott. He has composed the musical scores for over 50 theatre productions.

After training at the London Academy of Music and Dramatic Art, Duncan began his career in repertory theatre in 1968. He continued to act on stage and screen until the late 1980s, becoming a director of theatre and opera. His many opera productions include performances at the Royal Opera House, Covent Garden, Scottish Opera, English National Opera, Glyndebourne Festival, Bayerische Staatsoper in Munich and the Berlin Staatsoper.

== Early life and education ==
Duncan was born in Chelsea, London on 12 July 1948. He is the son of Margaret Elizabeth Duncan (née Thurlow) and Ronald Francis Hamilton Anson Duncan OBE, a Royal Naval captain and senior operations executive. Through his father, Duncan is a descendant of the British general Sir George Anson. He attended Durston House, a preparatory school in Ealing, and Westminster School from 1961 to 1966. While there, he was head of Wren's, one of the constituent school houses.

== Theatre ==
=== Acting ===
Duncan's stage credits have included plays by William Shakespeare (as Rosencrantz in Hamlet, Gonzalo in The Tempest, Gower in Pericles, Time in The Winter's Tale, Friar Laurence in Romeo and Juliet, and Banquo in Macbeth), George Bernard Shaw (in Village Wooing and as Frank in Mrs. Warren's Profession), and Noël Coward (in Tonight at 8.30 and as Garry Essendine in Present Laughter). He has played Trepan in The Master and Margarita, Governor Bellingham in The Scarlet Letter (Chichester Festival Theatre), and has performed in many musicals, including The Boy Friend as Alphonse, Privates on Parade as Charlie, Happy End as The Professor, Kiss Me Kate as Hortensio, Sweet Charity as Vittorio Vidal, Anything Goes as Sir Evelyn Oakleigh, and Company as Harry.

In 1987, Duncan became an associate artist of the Crucible Theatre, Sheffield, where his many roles included appearances in The History of Tom Jones, as Canon Chasuble in The Importance of Being Ernest, Antonio Salieri in Amadeus, Courtling in the British première of The Park by Botho Strauss, and Simeonov Pischik in The Cherry Orchard. For a year, he appeared in the acclaimed West End musical Happy as a Sandbag at the Ambassadors Theatre, later filmed for BBC Television. In 1984, he appeared as Brad Majors in the Italian Tour of The Rocky Horror Show.

=== Writing, directing, and designing ===
In 1976, Duncan formed The Fireflies of the Boulevard, a theatre company, with director Ultz. Among their dozens of plays performed across the UK, he has written and directed The Revels of Gargantua in Exile Part II (1974), Kino Tata (1976), Milady's Silver Musick (1977), The Amusing Spectacle of Cinderella and Her Naughty-Naughty Sisters (1977), Stringgames (1979), A Cow. A Mooon. A Full Stop (1997), and Two Or Three Women Walking (2005). In collaboration with Ultz, Duncan wrote A Night In Old Peking (1978), The Servant of Two Masters (1978), Merrie Pranckés (1980), and All In All, Lenore! (1982).

As director and co-writer of the National Theatre of Brent, Duncan collaborated on The Greatest Story Ever Told (1987) (BBC Radio) the Kiln and Edinburgh Fringe, The French Revolution (1989) on BBC Television), All the World's a Globe (1990) which won a Sony Award for Best Comedy, The Mysteries of Sex (Nottingham Playhouse), Love Upon The Throne (1998) Edinburgh Fringe) – and later the Bush, Berlin Festival and Comedy theatres – which was nominated for an Olivier Award for Best Comedy, Massive Landmarks of the 20th Century (1999) on Channel 4, The Wonder of Sex (2001) at the National Theatre, and The Mona Lisa which received a Sony Award for Best Comedy.

From 1994 to 1999, Duncan was Artistic Director of Nottingham Playhouse. His productions there included The Nose, The Adventures of Pinocchio, Kurt Weill and Bertolt Brecht's Happy End, A Fool and His Money (Scottish Opera and Birmingham Repertory Theatre), The Cabinet of Doktor Caligari (Lyric Theatre), Time and the Room (Edinburgh International Festival, Krapp's Last Tape with John Neville, and Endgame (Weimar Festival). In 1996, the Nottingham Playhouse was awarded the prestigious Prudential Award.

From 2002 to 2005, Martin was Co-Artistic Director of Chichester Festival Theatre. His productions there included The Gondoliers, Cole Porter’s Out of This World, How to Succeed in Business Without Really Trying (which won a UK Theatre Award for Best Musical), The Government Inspector, I Caught My Death In Venice with the Brothers Marquez, Botho Strauss' Seven Doors, and Doctor Faustus (Minerva Theatre).

As well as directing all of his own shows, Duncan has also directed Moses – The 10 Commandments (Theater St. Gallen), Man of La Mancha (Royal Lyceum Theatre), The Comedy of Errors (Maxim Gorki Theater), Jean Genet's The Blacks (Market Theatre of Johannesburg and Stockholm City Theatre), The Sunshine Boys (Deutsches Theater Berlin), The Rocky Horror Show (Deutsches Theater), 4 MARYs with Second Stride, The Small Moments (In Life) with Judith Weir (Royal Festival Hall), two World premières (Broken Biscuits and Puppy Dogs Tales) by Dave Pumford, two Crucible Theatre productions (Eugène Ionesco's The Bald Prima Donna and Guillaume Apollinaire's The Breasts of Tiresias), Andy Warhol's Pork (Eventhaus), School for Clowns (Lilian Baylis Theatre) with co-director Stephen Daldry, and Alexander Pushkin’s Mozart and Salieri (Crucible Theatre). Duncan was Associate Director on both Steven Pimlott's production of Twelfth Night at the Sheffield Crucible and the Pet Shop Boys' 1991 Performance Tour. With Clare Venables, he co-directed the musical Gypsy (Sheffield Crucible).

Duncan created the Chromolume Sequence for Stephen Sondheim's Sunday in the Park with George (1991, National Theatre). He directed Sondheim at 80 at the Royal Albert Hall for the BBC Proms in 2010, celebrating the 80th Birthday of Broadway composer Stephen Sondheim. The show starred Simon Russell Beale, Daniel Evans, Julian Ovenden, and Judi Dench who sang Sondheim's "Send In the Clowns", a piece originally written for actress Glynis Johns.

=== Composing ===
In musical theatre, Duncan has written scores for over 50 productions. These include plays by John Arden (The Hero Rises Up and Armstrong's Last Goodnight), Bertolt Brecht's Drums in the Night, An Italian Straw Hat (1970), The Glass Menagerie (1973), She Stoops to Conquer, Edward Bond's Bingo starring Sir John Gielgud (Royal Court Theatre), R. D. Laing's Knots (London/ Brooklyn Academy of Music), Cowardice (1982) starring Sir Ian McKellen and Janet Suzman (Ambassadors Theatre), A Mad World, My Masters and The Taming of the Shrew (Theatre Royal Stratford East), Pericles (Stockholm City Theatre), plays at the Crucible Theatre (including Tom Jones, Uncle Vanya, The Winter's Tale, The Breasts of Tiresias, and The Park), The Lady from the Sea (Citizens Theatre), and School for Clowns at the Lilian Baylis Theatre (1988).

=== Choreographing ===
Premiering on 12 October 1988, Duncan choreographed Stephen Lowe's Divine Gossip at the Royal Shakespeare Company's Pit Theatre. With the same company, he choreographed Eugène Ionesco's Macbett.

In 1986, Duncan staged the Masques for Nicholas Hytner's productions of Edward II (Manchester Royal Exchange) and The Tempest (Royal Shakespeare Company). At the Royal Exchange, he also staged the Masques for Ian McDiarmid's production of Don Juan.

== Opera ==
=== Writing and directing ===
Duncan has written the libretti for and directed two short operas: Three Really Good Tea Parties with composer Jonathan Dove at the Salisbury International Arts Festival and Warning Bells with writer Jeremy Sams in 1989, Dartington.

For Opera North, Duncan has directed several operas. These include L'heure espagnole (1989), Gianni Schicchi (1990), The Thieving Magpie (1992) Orpheus in the Underworld (1992), The Adventures of Pinocchio (2007), and A Midsummer Night's Dream (2008), and Yolanta (Edinburgh International Festival). For Munich's Bavarian State Opera, he directed the Opernwelt award-winning Xerxes (1996), La clemenza di Tito (1999), The Rake's Progress (2002), and Die Entführung aus dem Serail (2003).

Other productions include Albert Herring (1991, Canadian Opera Company), The Magic Flute (1993, Scottish Opera/ Royal Opera House), H.M.S. Pinafore, Die Fledermaus (1994, D'Oyly Carte Opera Company), Ariadne auf Naxos (1997, Scottish Opera/ 2007, Garsington Opera/ 2010, Norwegian Opera Company), The Last Supper (2000, Berlin State Opera/ 2001, Glyndebourne Opera), The Love for Three Oranges (2001, Cologne Opera), Pagliacci and Cavalleria rusticana (2002, Royal Albert Hall), La traviata (2003, Flanders Opera), The Gondoliers (2006, English National Opera), The Original Chinese Conjuror (2006, Aldeburgh Festival), The Adventures of Pinocchio (2008, Chemnitz Opera/ 2009, Minnesota Opera/ 2011, Moscow), Mirandolina (2009, Garsington Opera), Artaxerxes (2009, Royal Opera House), Armida (2010, Garsington Opera), La forza del destino (2010, Opera Holland Park), Betrothal in a Monastery (2011, Théâtre du Capitole de Toulouse/ 2011, Opéra-Comique), Il turco in Italia (2011, Garsington Opera), Noye's Fludde (2013, Aldeburgh Festival), Vert-Vert (2014, Garsington Opera), Alice’s Adventures in Wonderland (2013–17, Opera Holland Park), The Corridor and The Cure (2015, Aldeburgh Festival/ 2016, Holland Festival), and Fantasio (2019, Garsington Opera).

In 1992, Duncan was co-writer of the scenario for Matthew Bourne's The Nutcracker for Opera North and the Edinburgh International Festival, which he co-directed with Bourne. It received an Olivier Award nomination.

At the BBC Proms 2012, Duncan directed Gilbert and Sullivan's The Yeomen of the Guard.

=== Choreographing ===
Duncan was choreographer for the Cassandro Theatre Sequence in Tim Albery's 1991 production of Benvenuto Cellini at the Netherlands Opera.

== Film and television ==
Duncan's film credits include appearances in The Children of Icarus (a German television film), Flying into the Wind (a 1983 television film) as the prosecuting counsel, Forever Young (a 1983 film) as John, Caprice (a 1986 film short directed by Joanna Hogg) as the film director, and the award winning Flying Into the Wind (a television film by David Leland).

On television, Duncan has appeared in multiple episodes on such shows as The Legend of Robin Hood as Blondin and When the Boat Comes In as Roddy. With single episode appearances, he has appeared in Omnibus (in the 1990 episode Van Gogh) as the Impressionist Man and The Two Ronnies (in 1977 on BBC1).

== Other work ==
Duncan has written lyrics for four Chrysalis Records albums by musician Brian Protheroe: "Pinball" in 1974, "Pick-Up" in 1975, and "I/You" in 1976. He met Protheroe in 1968 at the Theatre Royal Lincoln and the two became a musical collaboration. In 2005, he wrote an additional album for Protheroe: "Citysong" with Basta label.

Between 2009 and 2012, Duncan was an artistic adviser to Ruth Mackenzie, Director of the 2012 Cultural Olympiad.

== Credits ==
=== Theatre ===
Year	Title	Director	Writer	Composer	Choreographer	Company	Venue (Note: In cases of theatre tours or multiple venues, only the premier venue is listed.)	Ref(s)
1973	An Italian Straw Hat	No	No	Yes	No	Lincoln Theatre Company	Theatre Royal Lincoln	
1973	Armstrong's Last Goodnight	No	No	Yes	No		Northcott Theatre	
1974	The Revels of Gargantua in Exile, Part II	Yes	Yes	Yes	No	The Fireflies of the Boulevard	Royal Court Theatre	
1976	Kino Tata	Yes	Yes	Yes	No	The Fireflies of the Boulevard	London's Rock Garden	
1976	Stringgames	Yes	Yes	No	No	The Fireflies of the Boulevard	Maximus Arena	
1977	Milady's Silver Musick	Yes	Yes	Yes	No	The Fireflies of the Boulevard	Theatre Royal Stratford East	
1977	The Amusing Spectacle of Cinderella and Her Naughty-Naughty Sisters	Yes	Yes	Yes	No	Theatre Royal Stratford East	Theatre Royal Stratford East	
1978	A Night in Old Peking	Yes	Yes	Yes	No	The Fireflies of the Boulevard	Theatre Royal Stratford East	
1978	The Servant of Two Masters	Yes	Yes	Yes	No	The Fireflies of the Boulevard	Birmingham Repertory Theatre	
1979	Stringgames	Yes	Yes	No	No	The Fireflies of the Boulevard	Gulbenkian Studio Newcastle	
1980	Merrie Pranckés	Yes	Yes	Yes	No	The Fireflies of the Boulevard	Institute of Contemporary Arts	
1981	Casual Sentence(s)	Yes	Yes	Yes	No	Durham Theatre Company		
1981	The Rocky Horror Show	Yes	No	No	No		Cinema Teatro Cristallo	
1982	All In All, Lenore!	Yes	Yes	Yes	No	The Fireflies of the Boulevard	Crucible Theatre	
1982	Cowardice	No	No	Yes	No		Ambassadors Theatre	
1987	The Greatest Story Ever Told	Yes	No	No	No	National Theatre of Brent	Assembly Rooms	
1988	School For Clowns	Yes	No	Yes	No		Lilian Baylis Theatre	
1988	Divine Gossip	No	No	No	Yes	Royal Shakespeare Company	Pit Theatre	
1988	The Tempest	No	No	No	Yes	Royal Shakespeare Company	Barbican Theatre	
1989	Warning Bells	Yes	Yes	No	No	Royal Shakespeare Company	Almeida Theatre	
1992	4 MARYs	Yes	Yes	No	No	Second Stride	Arnolfini	
1992	The Small Moments (In Life)	Yes	No	No	No		Royal Festival Hall	
1993	Stringgames	Yes	Yes	No	No	Royal Shakespeare Company	The Other Place	
1995	The Nose	Yes	No	No	No		Nottingham Playhouse	
1995	The Cabinet of Doktor Caligari	Yes	No	No	No		Nottingham Playhouse	
1997	A Cow. A Mooon. A Full Stop	Yes	Yes	No	No	The Fireflies of the Boulevard		
2000	H.M.S. Pinafore	Yes	No	No	No	D'Oyly Carte Opera Company	Savoy Theatre	
2001	The Comedy of Errors	Yes	No	No	No		Maxim Gorki Theater	
2001	The Blacks	Yes	No	No	No		Market Theatre of Johannesburg	
2001	The Wonder of Sex	Yes	Yes	No	No	National Theatre of Brent	Lytlelton Theatre	
2005	Two Or Three Women Walking	Yes	Yes	No	No	The Fireflies of the Boulevard	Chichester Festival Theatre	
2005	The Sunshine Boys	Yes	No	No	No		Deutsches Theater	
2007	Man of La Mancha	Yes	No	No	No	Royal Lyceum Company	Royal Lyceum Theatre	
2010	Sondheim at 80	Yes	No	No	No	BBC Proms	Royal Albert Hall	
2013	Moses – The 10 Commandments	Yes	No	No	No		Theater St. Gallen	

=== Opera ===
Year	Title	Director	Writer	Choreographer	Company	Venue (Note: In cases of opera tours or multiple venues, only the premier venue is listed.)	Ref(s)
1991	Benvenuto Cellini	Yes	No	Yes	Netherlands Opera		
1991	Albert Herring	Yes	No	No	Canadian Opera Company		
1992	The Nutcracker	Yes	Yes	No	Opera North	Sadler's Wells Theatre	
1993	The Magic Flute	Yes	No	No	Scottish Opera; Royal Opera House		
1994	H.M.S. Pinafore	Yes	No	No	D'Oyly Carte Opera Company		
1994	Die Fledermaus	Yes	No	No	D'Oyly Carte Opera Company		
1995	The Barber of Seville	Yes	No	No	English Touring Opera	Theatre Royal, Bath	
1997	Ariadne auf Naxos	Yes	No	No	Scottish Opera		
2000	The Last Supper	Yes	No	No	Berlin State Opera		
2001	The Love for Three Oranges	Yes	No	No	Cologne Opera		
2002	Pagliacci	Yes	No	No	Raymond Gubbay	Royal Albert Hall	
2002	Cavalleria rusticana	Yes	No	No	Raymond Gubbay	Royal Albert Hall	
2003	La traviata	Yes	No	No	Flanders Opera		
2006	The Gondoliers	Yes	No	No	English National Opera	London Coliseum	
2006	The Original Chinese Conjuror	Yes	No	No	Aldeburgh Festival	Southwold Pier	
2007	Ariadne auf Naxos	Yes	No	No	Garsington Opera		
2008	The Adventures of Pinocchio	Yes	No	No	Chemnitz Opera		
2009	The Adventures of Pinocchio	Yes	No	No	Minnesota Opera		
2009	Mirandolina	Yes	No	No	Garsington Opera		
2009	Artaxerxes	Yes	No	No	Royal Opera House	Linbury Theatre	
2010	Ariadne auf Naxos	Yes	No	No	Norwegian Opera Company		
2010	Armida	Yes	No	No	Garsington Opera		
2010	La forza del destino	Yes	No	No	Opera Holland Park		
2011	Betrothal in a Monastery	Yes	No	No	Opéra-Comique	Théâtre du Capitole de Toulouse	
2011	Il turco in Italia	Yes	No	No	Garsington Opera		
2013	Noye's Fludde	Yes	No	No	Aldeburgh Festival		
2013	Alice’s Adventures in Wonderland	Yes	No	No	Opera Holland Park		
2014	Vert-Vert	Yes	No	No	Garsington Opera		
2015	The Corridor	Yes	No	No	Aldeburgh Festival		
2015	The Cure	Yes	No	No	Aldeburgh Festival		
2019	Fantasio	Yes	No	No	Garsington Opera		

=== Film ===
Year	Title	Composer	Notes	Ref(s)
1975	Knots	Yes	Television film	

=== Radio ===
Year	Title	Director	Co-writer	Station	Company	Ref(s)
2004	National Theatre Of Brent's Complete And Utter History Of The Mona Lisa	Yes	Yes	BBC Radio 4	BBC	
2018	The National Theatre Of Brent's Illustrated Guide To Sex And How It Was Done	Yes	Yes	BBC Radio 4	CPL Productions	
2019	The First Man On The Moon And How They Done It	Yes	Yes	BBC Radio 4	CPL Productions	

=== Music ===
Year	Album	Writer	Artist	Ref(s)
1974	Pinball	Yes	Brian Protheroe	
1975	Pick-Up	Yes	Brian Protheroe	
1976	I/You	Yes	Brian Protheroe	
2005	Citysong	Yes	Brian Protheroe	

== Acting credits ==
=== Theatre ===
Year	Title	Role	Company	Venue	Ref(s)
1973	Bingo	Wally		Northcott Theatre	
1975	Happy as a Sandbag			Ambassadors Theatre	
1983	Pericles	John Gower	Theatre Royal Stratford East	Theatre Royal Stratford East	
1986	Amadeus	Antonio Salieri		Crucible Theatre	
1986	The History of Tom Jones	Mr Allworthy		Crucible Theatre	

=== Film ===
Year	Title	Role	Notes	Ref(s)
1977	Happy as a Sandbag		BBC Television film	
1983	Flying into the Wind	Prosecuting counsel	Television film	
1983	Forever Young	John		
1986	Caprice	Film director	Short	

=== Television ===
Year	Title	Role	Notes	Ref(s)
1975	The Legend of Robin Hood	Blondin	BBC Mini series; 2 episodes	
1977	Romance	Wedding guest	Episode: Emily	
1977	When the Boat Comes In	Roddy	3 episodes	
1978	The Two Ronnies	The Barbershop Quartet	BBC	
1990	Omnibus	Impressionist Man	BBC; Episode: Van Gogh	

== Vocalist credits ==
Year	Album	Artist	Ref(s)
1975	Pick-Up	Brian Protheroe	
1976	Happy As A Sandbag (Original London Cast Recording)	Ken Lee	
