= Jonas Brunvoll Jr. =

Norwegian opera singer and actor

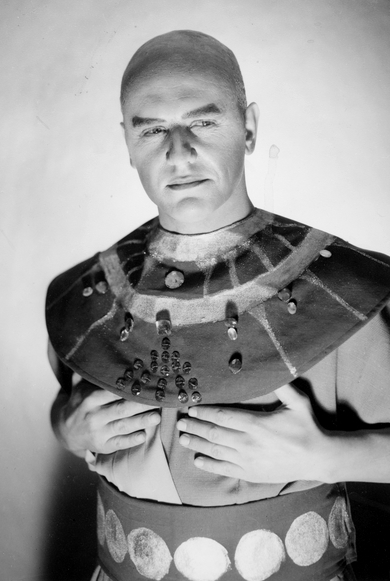

Background information
- Born: 3 August 1920; Bærum
- Died: 6 April 1982
- Genres: opera
- Instrument: vocals

Jonas Brunvoll (3 August 1920 – 6 April 1982) was a Norwegian opera singer and actor.

== Personal life ==
Brunvoll was born in Bærum; the son of Jonas Brunvoll and Kirsten Sørsdal, and was a brother of Gunnar Brunvoll.

During the Occupation of Norway by Nazi Germany he was involved in civil resistance. He was first arrested in October 1941, and held at Bredtveit Prison for a short period. He was then arrested in January 1942 and held at Møllergata 19 until 4 March, when he was incarcerated at Grini until 20 March, and then transferred to the Sachsenhausen concentration camp in Germany. In the memoir book 3 fra Sachsenhausen fellow prisoner and newspaper editor Olav Larssen recalls cultural activities in the camp, and mentions that Brunvoll would sing in such a way that prisoners forgot their surroundings, both at Grini and Sachsenhausen. His parents were also sent to German concentration camps, his mother to Ravensbrück and Auschwitz, and his father to Sachsenhausen.

== Career ==
Brunvoll made his debut as opera singer in 1941 as Colline in La Boheme at Trøndelag Teater. His debut concert in 1949 was attended by the Prime Minister of Norway, Einar Gerhardsen (and his wife) and the Minister of Foreign Affairs, Halvard Lange. Both Gerhardsen and Lange were fellow prisoners from Sachsenhausen. From 1950 to 1958, he was artistic director at the Norwegian Opera Company, which he had co-founded together with his brother in 1950. He was assigned at Den Norske Opera from 1958. Some of his major opera roles were Colline "La Boheme" (Puccini), Mefisto "Faust" (Gounod), Zuniga "Carmen" (Bizet), Figaro "Figaros Bryllup" (Mozart), Jeppe "Jeppe" (G. Tveitt), Leporello "Don Juan" (Mozart), Papageno "Tryllefløyten" (Mozart), Don Basilio "Barbereren i Sevilla" (Rossini), Nick Shadow "The Rake’s Progress" (Stravinsky). He worked as actor at Riksteatret from 1972. He participated in several films, including Døden i gatene from 1970, Rallarblod from 1979 and Arven from 1979, where he played "The Priest". He also participated in the 1972 TV production Fjeldeventyret for Fjernsynsteatret, where he played the role of a district sheriff.
