= Leslie Evershed-Martin =

English theatre impresario and politician

Leslie Eric Evershed-Martin CBE
- Born: 25 May 1903; Clapham, London
- Died: 7 January 1994 (aged 90)
- Occupations: Theatre impresario, city councillor and optician
- Spouse: Caroline Hull (m. 1929)
- Children: 2

Leslie Eric Evershed-Martin, CBE (1903–1994) was a British theatre manager, city councillor and optician, and founder of the Chichester Festival Theatre.

Evershed-Martin was born in Clapham, London in 1903. His father was a bank manager, and he trained as an optician. He was twice Mayor of Chichester and founded Chichester Players in 1933. In 1959, Evershed-Martin founded the Chichester Festival Theatre, and then successfully raised the funding to see this 'Impossible theatre' built, in 1960. The theatre opened with Laurence Olivier as its first artistic director, and attracted a host of prominent directors during its first two decades. In July 1963 he was recognised with the award of member (serving brother) of the Order of Saint John. He was awarded an OBE in June 1967, and a CBE in June 1990 for his services to theatre.

He married Caroline Hull in 1929; they had two sons. He died in 1994.

== Publications ==
- Evershed-Martin, Leslie. 1971. The Impossible Theatre: The Chichester Festival Theatre Adventure. Bognor Regis: Philimore & Co. ISBN 9780900592171.
