= Gunnar Brunvoll =

Norwegian impresario and opera administrator

- Born: 6 June 1924; Bærum, Norway
- Died: 27 April 1999 (aged 74)
- Occupations: impresario and opera administrator
- Parent(s): Jonas Brunvoll Sr. Kirsten Brunvoll
- Relatives: Jonas Brunvoll Jr. (brother)
- Awards: Commander of the Order of the Polar Star; Knight, First Class of the Order of St. Olav; Knight of the Order of Dannebrog

Gunnar Brunvoll (6 June 1924 – 27 April 1999) was a Norwegian impresario and opera administrator. He was co-founder of the Norwegian Opera Company, and was manager at Norwegian National Opera and Ballet for more than twenty years.

== Personal life ==
Brunvoll was born in Bærum as a son of Jonas Brunvoll and Kirsten Sørsdal, and was a brother of singer Jonas Brunvoll. He was married to Solveig Pettersen. During the Occupation of Norway by Nazi Germany he was involved in the civil resistance movement, including editing of the illegal newspaper Norge. Both his parents and his brother Jonas ended up in concentration camps in Germany, while Gunnar escaped to Sweden and further to Great Britain and Canada, where he was trained as a pilot at the training camp Little Norway.

== Career ==
Brunvoll did not continue his military career after World War II. In 1945 he established his own impresario and concert agency. The agency introduced strongmen, illusionists and performing artists. Among the artists were opera singers Aase Nordmo Løvberg and Ragnar Ulfung, and singer-songwriter Alf Prøysen. Brunvoll co-founded the Norwegian Opera Company in 1949, along with his brother Jonas and István Pajor, and directed this company from 1949 to 1958. He served as manager at Den Norske Opera from 1958 to 1979. He was a board member of the International Association of Opera Directors from 1962 to 1965, and chairman of the board of the Norwegian National Academy of Opera from 1988 to 1992. He was vice chairman of Norsk Film from 1965 to 1971. He was decorated Commander of the Order of the Polar Star, Knight, First Class of the Order of St. Olav, and Knight of the Order of Dannebrog.
