= Jonas Brunvoll Sr. =

Norwegian advertisement manager, editor and politician

Jonas Brunvoll (21 June 1894 – 1 December 1969) was a Norwegian advertisement manager, editor and politician for the Labour Party.

He was born in Ålesund as a son of fisherman Nils Brunvoll (1861–1944) and Beret Sæterø. In 1919 he married Kirsten Sørsdal (1895–1976). They settled at Jar, and their sons Gunnar and Jonas Jr. became opera administrator and opera singer, respectively.

After finishing middle school in 1910, he worked as a postal clerk until 1916. He took postal school in 1913, but also commerce school at Treider in 1917, whereupon he was hired as a bank clerk. From 1920 he worked in the press, and in 1923 he finished his fourth education; advertising school. He was elected as a member of Bærum municipal council in 1929, and was continuously re-elected. In 1936 he became a member of the municipal council's executive committee, and also board member of Bærum Hospital. He also served as board member of Oslo salgs- og reklameforening from 1936 to 1938. In 1939 he was hired as advertisement manager in the Labour Party main organ Arbeiderbladet, a job he kept until 1964.

During the occupation of Norway by Nazi Germany from 1940 to 1945, Arbeiderbladet was shut down already in the first year. His entire family joined the Norwegian resistance movement. Jonas Brunvoll was arrested by the Nazi authorities in October 1941, being imprisoned in Bredtveit concentration camp. On 31 July 1942 he was transferred to Grini concentration camp. After two transfers in August 1942, first to Møllergata 19 and then to Bredtveit again, he was incarcerated at Grini for a second time from November 1942. On 30 September 1943 he was further transferred to Sachsenhausen concentration camp, where he remained until the camp was liberated. His son Jonas and wife Kirsten were arrested in January 1942, while Gunnar narrowly escaped. Jonas wound up in Sachsenhausen, Kirsten in Ravensbrück and Auschwitz, but both survived.

After the Second World War, Brunvoll returned to Arbeiderbladet which had resumed operations. In 1946 he ended his spell in Bærum municipal council, but was upgraded to chairman of Bærum Hospital, which he remained until 1964. He also chaired Griniklubben from 1946 to 1948, and was a board member of Norsk samband for politiske fanger; two associations for political prisoners. A temperance activist, he became a board member of Arbeidernes avholdslandslag in 1945 and served as chairman from 1958 to 1961. He also edited the magazine Avholds-Arbeideren until 1961. He died in December 1969.
