= Ruth Mackenzie, Baroness Mackenzie of Sherwood =

British artistic director and politician (born 1957/8)

The Right Honourable The Baroness Mackenzie of Sherwood CBE
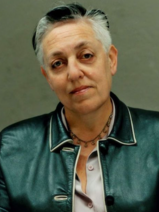
- Portrait of Mackenzie

Parliamentary Under-Secretary of State for Arts and Museums
- Incumbent
- Assumed office 22 July 2026
- Prime Minister: Andy Burnham
- Preceded by: Ian Murray (Arts); The Baroness Twycross (Museums)

Member of the House of Lords
- Lord Temporal
- Life peerage 24 August 2026

Personal details
- Born: Ruth Mackenzie Reading, Berkshire, England
- Party: Labour

Ruth Mackenzie, Baroness Mackenzie of Sherwood (born 1957 or 1958) is a British artistic director and politician. In July 2026, she was appointed as Parliamentary Under-Secretary of State in the Department for Digital, Culture, Media and Sport by incoming British prime minister Andy Burnham.

She has worked extensively in the UK and Europe, and was responsible for the London 2012 Festival. In 2022 she was appointed as artistic director of the Adelaide Festival of Arts in South Australia, a role she held until her appointment as an arts policy director within the South Australian Department of the Premier and Cabinet in August 2024. In June 2025, Mackenzie returned to London to become director of arts at the British Council. As of July 2026, she continues in this role.

== Early life and education ==
Ruth Mackenzie was born in 1957 or 1958 in Reading, England. She grew up first in South Africa then in London.

== Career ==
=== Arts administration ===
Mackenzie was a drama officer for Arts Council England. She was executive director of Nottingham Playhouse from 1990 until 1997, when she became director of Scottish Opera. She was co-artistic director of the Chichester Festival Theatre from 2003 to 2005, alongside Steven Pimlott and Martin Duncan. She has also been general director of the Manchester International Festival.

She was director of the London 2012 Festival, the official cultural programme of the London 2012 Olympics.

Mackenzie was appointed artistic director of the Holland Festival in Amsterdam in 2013, which saw her deliver four festivals from 2015 to 2018. She also acted as consultant dramaturg of the Vienna Festwochen. She became the first female artistic director of the Théâtre du Châtelet in Paris, France, in 2017 but was sacked from the job in August 2020 for reasons that remain unclear years later.

In early 2022 Mackenzie worked with the Mayor of London, Sadiq Khan, on the "Let's Do London" campaign.

In March 2022, she was announced as the artistic director of the Adelaide Festival from its 2023 edition. Initially she worked with the incumbent co-directors Neil Armfield and Rachel Healy, before taking over in mid-2022. In August 2024 it was announced that Mackenzie had been appointed program director, arts, culture and creative industries policy within the South Australian Department of the Premier and Cabinet.

In June 2025, Mackenzie joined the British Council as their new director of arts. She continues in the role subsequently to her appointment to government in July 2026.

=== Politics ===
On 22 July 2026, British prime minister Andy Burnham appointed Mackenzie to serve as Parliamentary Under-Secretary of State in the Department for Digital, Culture, Media and Sport, which included a life peerage in order to be able to serve in the junior ministerial position in the House of Lords. The role involves assisting the senior minister in charge of the department, as an arts minister. Mackenzie was created as Baroness Mackenzie of Sherwood in the City of Nottingham on 24 August 2026. On 11 September 2026, she made her maiden speech during a debate on the Creative Education Access Bill.

== Recognition and awards ==
Mackenzie was appointed a member of the Order of the British Empire in 1995, and a Commander of the Order of the British Empire for her work on the 2012 London Olympics.

On 22 July 2026, Andy Burnham nominated Mackenzie for a life peerage.

== Other roles ==
Mackenzie has also been a special adviser to five Secretaries of State for Culture, Media and Sport, and has acted as a consultant to the Barbican Centre, the London Symphony Orchestra, Google, the BBC and the Tate Gallery. She was appointed chair of the London Area Council of the Arts Council, with her term running from 1 July 2018 until 30 June 2022, after being nominated by London mayor Sadiq Khan.
