= Kirsten Brunvoll =

Norwegian politician (1895–1976)

- Born: Sørsdal; 24 December 1895; Lier, Norway
- Died: 5 April 1976 (aged 80)
- Spouse: Jonas Brunvoll, Sr.
- Relatives: Gunnar Brunvoll – son Jonas Brunvoll, Jr. – son

Kirsten Brunvoll, née Sørsdal (24 December 1895 – 5 April 1976), was a Norwegian playwright, resistance member, Nacht und Nebel prisoner, World War II memoirist and politician for the Labour Party.

== Biography ==
She was born in Lier to blacksmith Gabriel Sørsdal and Kristiane Zell. She married Jonas Brunvoll in 1919, and had two sons Jonas and Gunnar. The family settled at Jar in Bærum. Between 1929 and 1939 she was a prolific playwright, mostly writing comedic plays.

During the occupation of Norway by Nazi Germany the Brunvoll family took part in civil resistance; the whole family contributed to production and distribution of the illegal newspapers Norge and Norge Krigsnytt. When the undercover newspaper organization was discovered by the Gestapo in 1941, several family members were arrested. Kirsten Brunvoll's husband and her son Jonas ended up in the Sachsenhausen concentration camp, but both survived the war. Gunnar escaped to Sweden and further to Great Britain and Canada, where he was trained as a pilot.

Brunvoll was arrested and incarcerated at the Grini concentration camp in January 1942, and was transferred to Germany, to Ravensbrück, a camp specifically for women, in February 1943. While in Ravensbrück, being unfit for slave labour due to illness, she was selected for "transport", and ended up at the Majdanek concentration camp in German-occupied Poland. She was later transferred to the extermination camp Birkenau, a subcamp of the Auschwitz concentration camp system, where she arrived in 1944. Since the Birkenau gas chambers were designated specifically for killing Jews, the camp authorities had SS physicians sort out non-Jews based on their ability to work. Brunvoll reported she was fit for work, asking for a position as knitter. The following winter she was sent for transport again, a long walk under harsh conditions. The weakest women, those who could not keep up with the others, received no mercy and were shot by the German SS guards, their corpses left behind. Brunvoll ended up back in the Ravensbrück concentration camp. She was eventually rescued by the White Buses.

Brunvoll published the memoir book Veien til Auschwitz in 1947. She also issued one last play, Lønningsdag ("Pay Day") in 1948. She served as a deputy representative to the Parliament of Norway from Akershus during the terms 1945–1949 and 1950–1953. In total she met during 17 days of parliamentary session.
