= Pinball and Other Stories =

Front cover

Pinball and Other Stories is a compilation album by Brian Protheroe. It was released by EMI in 2006.

== Track listing ==
=== originally from Pinball ===
- 1. "Pinball"
- 2. "Goodbye Surprise"
- 3. "Money Love"
- 4. "Changing My Tune"
- 5. "Fly Now"
- 6. "Monkey"

=== originally from Pick Up ===
- 7. "Enjoy It"
- 8. "Oh, Weeping Will"
- 9. "Running Through The City"
- 10. "Soft Song"
- 11. "Pick-Up"

=== originally from I/You ===
- 12. "I/You"
- 13. "Dancing On Black Ice"
- 14. "Never Join The Fire Brigade"
- 15. "Hotel"
- 16. "The Face And I"

=== originally from Unreleased ===
- 17. "Thick And Creamy"
- 18. "Cold Harbour"

=== originally from Citysong ===
- 19. "Holyoke Hotel"
