= The Last Supper (opera) =

Opera

- Opera by Harrison Birtwistle
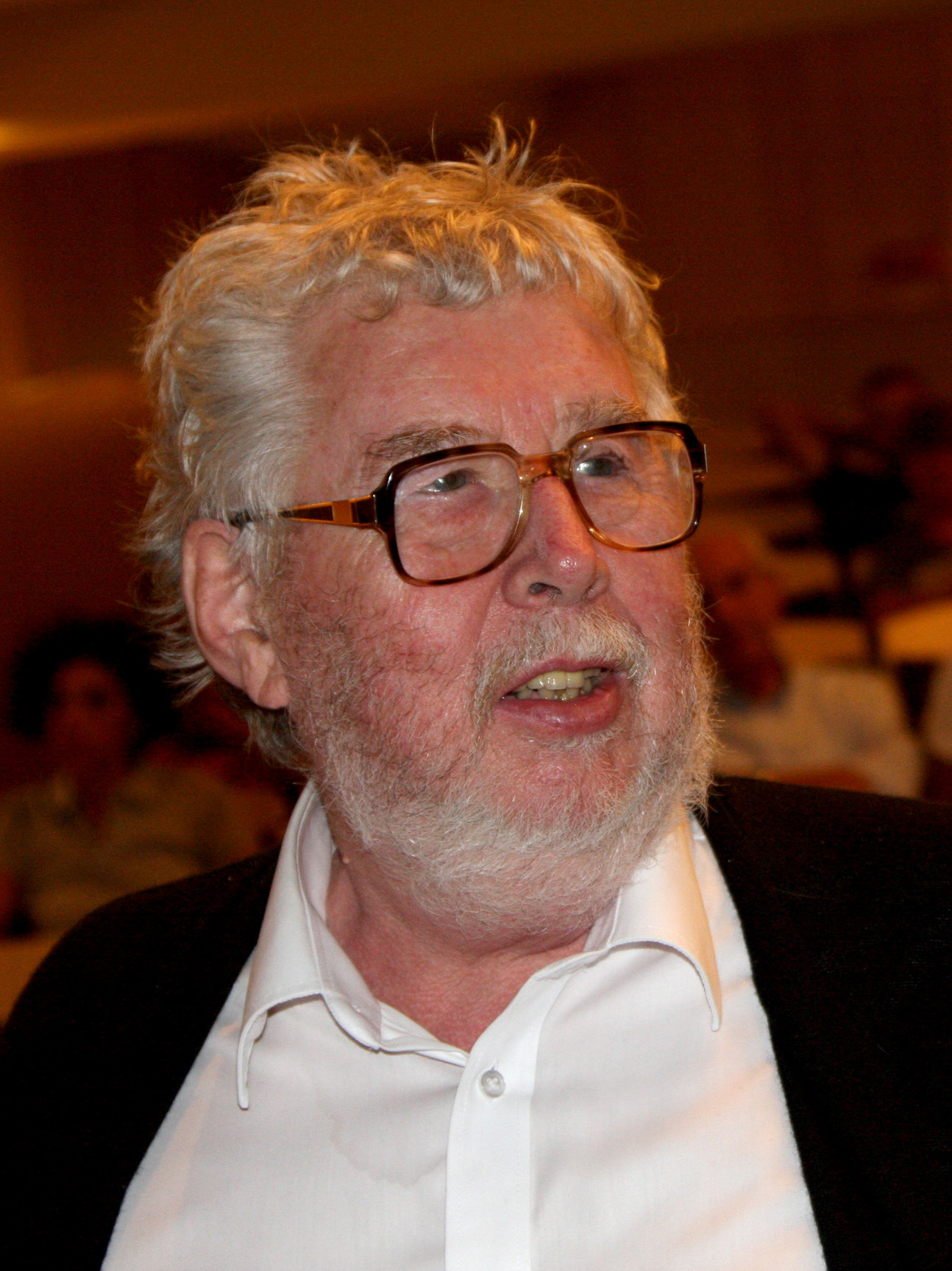
- The composer in 2008
- Librettist: Robin Blaser
- Language: English
- Based on: Last Supper
- Premiere: 18 April 2000; Berlin State Opera

The Last Supper is an opera with music by Sir Harrison Birtwistle to an English and Latin libretto by Robin Blaser. Birtwistle composed the music over the period written in 1998–1999. The world premiere was given by the Berlin State Opera on 18 April 2000, with the production directed by Martin Duncan and conducted by Daniel Barenboim. It was subsequently performed by the Glyndebourne Touring Opera in October/November 2000 and the following summer at the 2001 Glyndebourne Festival. Many of the original cast returned for two concert performances at the Piccolo Teatro Studio Expo, Milan and the Teatro Valdocco, Turin on 4–5 September 2008 with the London Sinfonietta, conducted by Elgar Howarth as part of the Settembre Musica festival.

== Roles ==
- Christ (baritone)
- Judas (tenor)
- Ghost (soprano)
- Little James (countertenor)
- James (countertenor)
- Thomas (tenor)
- Andrew (tenor)
- Simon (tenor)
- Bartholomew (tenor)
- Philip (baritone)
- John (baritone)
- Thomas (bass-baritone)
- Thaddeus (bass)
- Peter (bass)

Choral parts

- Chorus Mysticus (amplified); 3 sopranos, 3 mezzo-sopranos, 3 altos
- Chorus Resonus (pre-recorded); 3 sopranos, 3 mezzo-sopranos, 3 altos
- Chorus in Visions I-III (pre-recorded); 3 sopranos, 3 mezzo-sopranos, 3 altos, 3 tenors, 3 baritones, 3 basses

Original cast

- Christ: William Dazeley
- Judas: Tom Randle
- Ghost: Susan Bickley
- Little James: Stephen Wallace
- James: Andrew Watts
- Thomas: Michael Hart-Davis
- Andrew: Colin Judson
- Simon: Hilton Marlton
- Bartholomew: Christopher Lemmings
- Philip: Adrian Powter
- John: Andrew Rupp
- Matthew: Paul Reeves
- Thaddeus: Simon Kirkbride
- Peter: Geoffrey Moses

== Synopsis ==
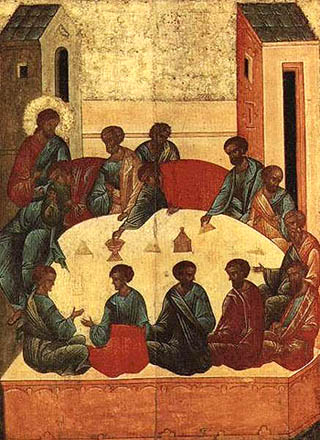
The Last Supper, icon, 1497

The story is a contemporary retelling of the "Last Supper" story. It involves a character (Ghost) who represents ourselves/the audience. Ghost invites Christ and his disciples to supper. The ensuing drama juxtaposes the old and new, Jewish and Christian to raise questions about the myth/story of the Last Supper and its meaning in our modern context. The opera ends in the Garden of Olives with Christ asking, "Whom do you seek?" and then a cock crows.
