= Frank Hauser (director) =

British theatre director

Frank Hauser CBE (1 August 1922 – 14 October 2007) was a British theatre director.

== Early career ==
Frank Ivor Hauser was born in Cardiff, the son of a Polish property-dealer, and was a precocious talent at Cardiff High School, gifted enough musically to contemplate a musical career. After attending Christ Church, Oxford, he went into the Royal Artillery (1942–45) before taking up a post as a BBC radio trainee director. In a then-lively drama department, he worked on a wide range of programmes, from Home Service soaps ( Mrs Dale's Diary) to Third Programme classics. Significantly it was during this time that he first directed the young Richard Burton in Henry V.

In 1951, Hauser had applied to become Alec Guinness's assistant on his Festival of Britain production of Hamlet. Guinness had meant to direct it himself, but when Hauser materialised Guinness told him, "Don't be my assistant, be co-director."

== Oxford Playhouse ==
After a short spell at Salisbury Playhouse, Hauser was appointed Artistic Director of the long-neglected 700-seat Oxford Playhouse in 1956. During his tenure he presented a host of world premieres and directed many leading actors including Judi Dench, Ian McKellen, Leo McKern, Alan Badel, Dirk Bogarde, Yvonne Mitchell and Constance Cummings.

In 1966 he persuaded his old friend Richard Burton and his wife Elizabeth Taylor to star in an OUDS production of Marlowe's Doctor Faustus to raise fund for an extension at the Playhouse.

== Later work ==
After leaving Oxford in 1973, Hauser directed many West End productions including Robert Bolt's A Man for All Seasons (Savoy, 1987), with Charlton Heston as Sir Thomas More. His last production was the Chichester Festival Theatre production of Hobson's Choice.
