= Steven Pimlott =

English opera and theatre director

- Born: Steven Charles Pimlott; April 18, 1953; England
- Died: February 14, 2007 (aged 53); Great Horkesley, Essex, England
- Occupations: Opera and theatre director
- Years active: 1976–2007
- Spouse: Daniela Bechly (m. 1991)
- Children: Oskar, Raphael, Phoebe
- Awards: OBE (2007 New Year Honours)

Steven Charles Pimlott OBE (18 April 1953 – 14 February 2007) was an English opera and theatre director, whose obituary in The Times hailed him as "one of the most versatile and inventive theatre directors of his generation". His output ran the gamut of the theatrical and operatic repertoire, from musicals, such as Joseph and the Amazing Technicolour Dreamcoat, and popular plays, such as Agatha Christie's And Then There Were None, through classics such as Shakespeare and Molière, to Stephen Sondheim and James Lapine's Sunday in the Park with George and Alexander Borodin's Prince Igor.

== Early life ==
Pimlott's father worked in insurance, but Steven was interested in the performing arts from a young age. The first film he saw, The King and I, and first theatre visit, to see Christopher Plummer in Richard III at Stratford, both made a great impression. He was educated at Manchester Grammar School, where he met the younger Nicholas Hytner. They performed together in the school orchestra (Hytner played flute and Pimlott the oboe) and in school plays: Pimlott was an admired Gertrude opposite TV historian Michael Wood's Hamlet. Reading English at Sidney Sussex College, Cambridge, Pimlott also acted in university productions with Hytner and Declan Donnellan.

== Opera and theatre work ==
Pimlott began his career with the English National Opera, where he was Staff Director from 1976 to 1978. He moved to Opera North from 1978 to 1980, directing productions of Puccini's La bohème and Tosca, Verdi's Nabucco and Massenet's Werther, and the British première of Alexander Borodin's Prince Igor, which he translated with David Lloyd-Jones. He then worked with Scottish Opera, directing Don Giovanni, and Opera Australia, and then worked in regional opera houses in Manchester, Leeds and Sheffield.

While at the Crucible Theatre in Sheffield, he directed productions of Twelfth Night and The Winter's Tale. In 1988, he directed a production of the York Mystery Plays which was staged in the city's Museum Gardens, against the backdrop of the ruined St Mary's Abbey, and which featured the Indian actor Victor Banerjee as Jesus. Also in 1988, he directed the British première of Botho Strauss's Der Park. The same year he directed Samson et Dalila of Camille Saint-Saens at the Bregenzer Festspiele and subsequently at the Dutch National Opera in Amsterdam.

Pimlott developed a wide range of theatrical work, which included avant garde, Shakespeare and popular musicals, such as the revival of Joseph and the Amazing Technicolor Dreamcoat with Jason Donovan and then Phillip Schofield at the Palladium in 1991 and on Broadway in 1993, Doctor Dolittle at the Hammersmith Apollo in 1998, and Bombay Dreams and at the Apollo Victoria in 2002 and in New York in 2004. At the National Theatre, he worked on the British première of Stephen Sondheim and James Lapine's Sunday in the Park with George in 1990, and a new translation of Molière's The Miser in 1991.

Pimlott directed many works with the Royal Shakespeare Company, working with RSC artistic director Adrian Noble, beginning with Julius Caesar in 1991, with Robert Stephens as the lead. He later produced Richard III in 1995, with David Troughton as the lead actor; Richard II in 2000 with Samuel West as the title character and David Troughton as Bolingbroke; and Hamlet at Stratford in 2001 with West again as the lead. For the RSC, he also produced T. S. Eliot's Murder in the Cathedral in 1993, Tennessee Williams' Camino Real at Stratford in 1997, with Leslie Phillips, Peter Egan and Susannah York, and staged Antony and Cleopatra at Stratford in 1999, with Alan Bates and Frances de la Tour (although an opening scene that showed oral sex was dropped when the production moved to London). He was Company Director at the RSC in Stratford in 1996 and an Associate Director of the RSC from 1996 to 2002. During his time with the RSC he also had Jason Carr (the composer of incidental music to ten of his RSC plays) commissioned to write a musical adaption of Charles Kingsley's novel The Water Babies; in the end the RSC never produced it but Pimlott later had it mounted at Chichester where he was Artistic Director, alongside Martin Duncan and Ruth Mackenzie, from 2003 to 2005. Pimlott also directed world premières of Phyllis Nagy's Butterfly Kiss, The Strip and Neverland.

His restaging of Joseph and the Amazing Technicolor Dreamcoat was revived in 2007 at London's Adelphi Theatre with Lee Mead in the title role. Before the show opened, booking was so brisk that the musical's originally planned six-month run was doubled. "I suppose he’s a dreamer. Even when things are going really badly he never gives up hope", Pimlott wrote of Joseph in the 1991 production's programme. "We all dream a lot, some are lucky, some are not..."

== Last years ==
A lifelong Gilbert and Sullivan afficiando, he was the director of the short-lived Savoy Theatre Opera project in 2004, founded by Raymond Gubbay. He took to the stage for the D'Oyly Carte Opera Company in their last season at the Strand, playing Sir Joseph Porter in H.M.S. Pinafore. With Martin Duncan and Ruth Mackenzie, he was appointed as the joint artistic director of the Chichester Festival Theatre between 2003 and 2005, reviving its fortunes.

He directed Agatha Christie's And Then There Were None at the Gielgud Theatre in the West End in 2005, with Tara FitzGerald, Gemma Jones and Graham Crowden, and Tchaikovsky's Eugene Onegin at the Royal Opera House in 2006. He was awarded the OBE in the 2007 New Year Honours list.

Although he had been suffering from lung cancer, at the time of his death he was rehearsing a revival of Tennessee Williams' The Rose Tattoo, starring Zoë Wanamaker, which was taken over by his friend Nicholas Hytner. Also in later years, Pimlott's oboe playing became something more than a hobby, and he played in a number of professional concerts.

He married German soprano Daniela Bechly in 1991. Steven died at home in February 2007. Daniela, along with their two sons, Oskar and Raphael, and daughter, Phoebe, continue living in their family home in Great Horkesley.
