= The Father (Osborne play) =

The Father is a play by British playwright John Osborne. An adaptation of August Strindberg's Swedish original, it opened at the National Theatre on 26 October 1988, starring Alun Armstrong.
