= Pinball (song) =

1974 song by Brian Protheroe

Single by Brian Protheroe

from the album Pinball
- B-side: "Money Love"
- Released: August 1974
- Genre: Soft rock, jazz rock, progressive pop
- Length: 3:13
- Label: Chrysalis
- Producer: Del Newman

Brian Protheroe singles chronology
"Pinball" (1974)	"Fly Now" (1975)

Official Audio
- "Pinball" on YouTube

"Pinball" is a 1974 song by the actor and musician Brian Protheroe. An autobiographical song written whilst Protheroe was living in a friend's flat in Covent Garden, it was released as his first single after he was signed by Chrysalis on the strength of a song he wrote and performed in a play. Upon release, it gave Protheroe his only hit, reaching a peak position of 22 on the UK Singles Chart in September 1974. It was later included on his debut album of the same title.

== Background ==
Though he had been interested in music from an early age, Brian Protheroe had focused on a burgeoning acting career in the years leading up to his musical releases. His initial stage performances in 1966–67 were with his local repertory theatre at Salisbury Playhouse. After leaving Salisbury, Protheroe settled with the New Theatre Royal Lincoln in 1968. There he met Martin Duncan, who became a musical collaborator. Stage roles such as in Bath Theatre Royal's 1970 production of A Midsummer Night's Dream, for which he was also the composer, followed, as well as television appearances in the historical drama Frontier and the anthology mystery series The Rivals of Sherlock Holmes. In 1973, Protheroe appeared in a production of William Fairchild's play Death on Demand in the role of a pop singer. For the play, he set a lyric written by Fairchild to music and, after it had been shopped around by Fairchild, this composition caught the attention of a Chrysalis Records rep. The label signed Protheroe as a solo artist. Protheroe never released a recording of the song from Death on Demand, instead opting for "Pinball" as his debut single.

== Composition ==
"Pinball" is an autobiographical song, described by Protheroe as "a diary entry for one particular weekend in 1973", a time when he had just split up with his girlfriend and was living in a friend's flat in Covent Garden. The song describes Protheroe's despondent feelings ("my music bores me once again"), setbacks ("and I've run out of pale ale") and activities ("I've been on the pinball") at this time. It has been described by one reviewer as "example of ennui, Covent Garden Blues". The lyrics also reference Marilyn Monroe and the Beatles' "Hey Jude". There is no chorus, with the track being made up of several melodically identical verses. The song begins with an acoustic guitar riff, and builds to include elements such as a tenor saxophone (played by Tony Coe), bass, drums and sound effects such as a cat's meow after the lyric "And the cat just finished off the bread". The single was produced by Del Newman, who would produce all three of Protheroe's 1970s albums.

== Release ==
"Pinball" was released as a single in August 1974, backed by "Money Love". It entered the UK Singles Chart at number 40 and eventually reached a peak of number 22 in September. It spent six weeks on the chart. Protheroe performed the song over a backing track, on Top of the Pops, during its chart run, on 20 September 1974. He would later reflect on this time: "When I was on Top of the Pops the record label said 'right, we'll get you a velvet suit' I said, 'NO'. To succeed in the music business to have to embrace everything and I wasn't prepared to do that. I was an actor and much more comfortable in that world. I did no touring, just a couple of concerts around London."

== Reception and legacy ==
The song has received critical acclaim. Upon release, Reading Evening Post's Pete Butterfield called "Pinball" "one of the most interesting singles of the year" while Max Bell of New Musical Express praised the song's production and its "instant, stylised commercialism". Among retrospective reviews, AllMusic's Stephen Thomas Erlewine has described the song as "an exquisite piece of post-McCartney pop" and Scott Hammond of The Fix Magazine has declared it "one of the lost gems of the 1970s".

"Pinball" was included on Sean Rowley's Guilty Pleasures compilation album, released in 2004. The song provided the inspiration for the track "Riverman" from Noel Gallagher's 2015 album Chasing Yesterday. Gallagher had been introduced to the song by Morrissey in a Los Angeles bar. Paul Weller released a cover version of "Pinball" on his new (2025) album Find El Dorado.

"Pinball" remains Protheroe's only hit single, and his best known song. Both sides of the single appeared on Protheroe's debut album, also titled Pinball, and the track also lent its name to the first compilation of his music, Pinball and Other Stories, released in 2006. In that release's booklet, Protheroe reflects on the song; "I'm very proud of "Pinball". It perfectly encapsulates how I was feeling at the time".

== Track listing ==
=== 7" Single ===
No.	Title	Length
1.	"Pinball"	3:05
2.	"Money Love"	3:19
