= Ian Judge =

British theatre and opera director (1946–2025)

- Born: 21 July 1946
- Died: 15 September 2025 (aged 79)
- Education: Guildhall School of Music and Drama

Ian Judge (21 July 1946 – 15 September 2025) was an English theatre and opera director. He directed Charles Gounod's Faust and Arrigo Boito's Mefistofele for the English National Opera, Richard Wagner's Der fliegende Holländer for the Royal Opera House, and Giacomo Puccini's Madama Butterfly for the Los Angeles Opera.
