= Chichester Festival Theatre =

Theatre in West Sussex, England

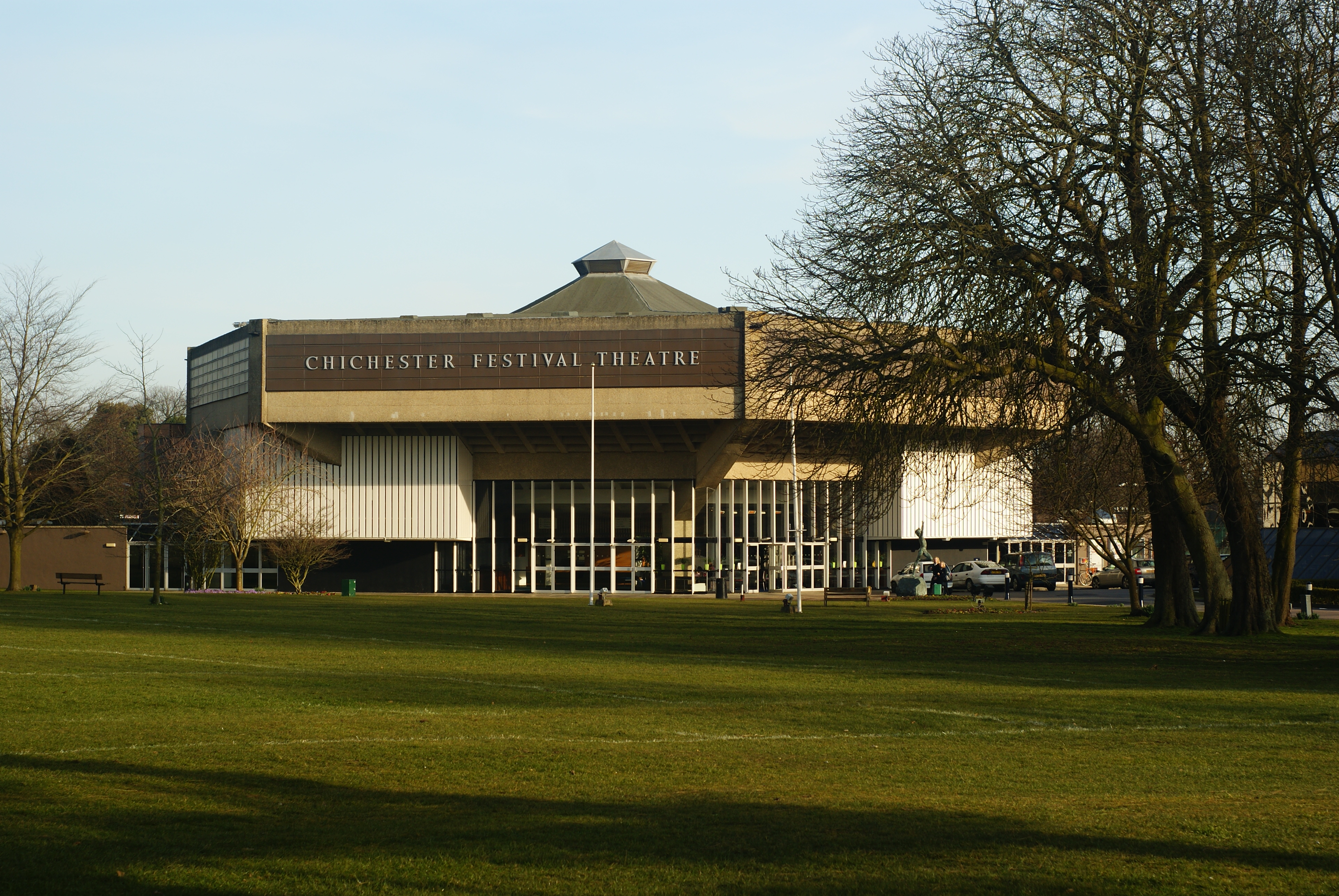
- The Festival Theatre in March 2010.

- Location of the Festival Theatre within Chichester
- Address: Oaklands Park; Chichester, West Sussex; England
- Coordinates: 50.843048°N 0.777390°W
- Capacity: Festival Theatre: 1206; Minerva Theatre: 283
- Public transit: Chichester railway station

Construction
- Opened: 1962
- Architects: Philip Powell and Hidalgo Moya

Website
- www.cft.org.uk

Listed Building – Grade II*
- Official name: Chichester Festival Theatre
- Designated: 12 June 1998
- Reference no.: 1323693

Chichester Festival Theatre is a theatre and Grade II* listed building situated in Oaklands Park in the city of Chichester, West Sussex, England. Designed by Philip Powell and Hidalgo Moya, it was opened by its founder Leslie Evershed-Martin in 1962. The smaller and more intimate Minerva Theatre was built nearby in 1989. A third venue, The Nest, a 120-seat studio space for work by emerging artists, opened in July 2025.

The inaugural artistic director was Sir Laurence Olivier, and it was at Chichester that the first National Theatre company was formed. Chichester's productions would transfer to the National Theatre's base at the Old Vic in London. The opening productions in 1962 were: The Chances by John Fletcher (first production 1638) which opened on 3 July; The Broken Heart (1633), by John Ford, opened 9 July; and Uncle Vanya (1896), by Anton Chekov, opened 16 July and highly acclaimed. Among the actors in the opening season were: Lewis Casson, Fay Compton, Joan Greenwood, Rosemary Harris, Kathleen Harrison, Keith Michell, André Morell, John Neville, Laurence Olivier, Joan Plowright, Michael Redgrave, Athene Seyler, Sybil Thorndike and Peter Woodthorpe.

The Festival Season usually runs from April to October and includes productions from classics to contemporary writing and musicals, reaching an audience of 230,000. Productions originated at Chichester frequently transfer to London or tour nationally and internationally.

A range of additional events is designed to add to the experience of visiting the theatre, including performances, cabarets, family days, tours and talks. Through the winter months, the theatre presents touring productions and a Christmas show mounted by Chichester Festival Youth Theatre, the most recent of which being a musical adaptation of Matt Haig's book A Boy Called Christmas, directed by Dale Rooks. The theatre runs a large and active Learning, Education and Participation programme for all ages; its Youth Theatre is one of the largest in the country, with over 800 members.

The theatre is a registered charity and is chaired by Mark Foster. Justin Audibert has been the artistic director since April 2023, sharing the leadership of the theatre with executive director Kathy Bourne.

== History ==
Leslie Evershed-Martin drew parallels between Chichester and the Canadian city of Stratford, Ontario, and concluded that Chichester could sustain a theatre similar to the Stratford Festival. Evershed-Martin contacted Laurence Olivier via Tyrone Guthrie and offered him directorship of the new theatre. Olivier directed the theatre until 1966, when John Clements took over.

== Artistic directors ==
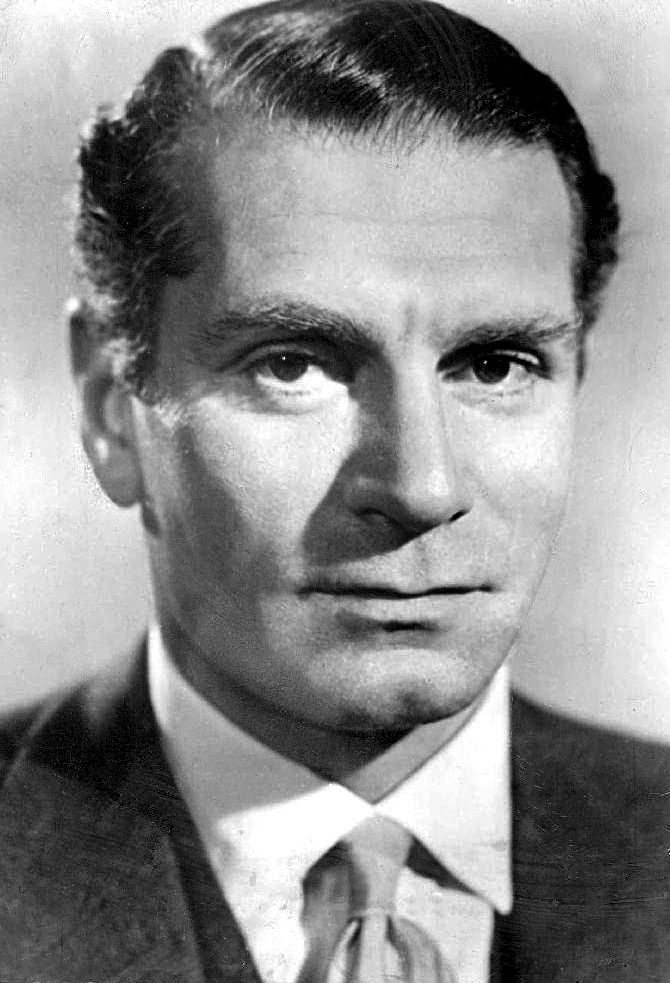
Laurence Olivier, first director of the Chichester Festival Theatre, in 1961

- Sir Laurence Olivier (1962–1965)
- Sir John Clements (1966–1973)
- Keith Michell (1974–1977)
- Peter Dews (1978–1980)
- Patrick Garland (1981–1984)
- John Gale (1985–1989)
- Michael Rudman (1990)
- Patrick Garland (1991–1994)
- Sir Derek Jacobi and Duncan Weldon (1995–1997)
- Andrew Welch (1998–2002)
- Martin Duncan, Ruth Mackenzie and Steven Pimlott (2003–2005)
- Jonathan Church (2006–2016)
- Daniel Evans (2016–2023)
- Justin Audibert (2023–present)

== See also ==
- Chichester Festival production history
- Grade II* listed buildings in West Sussex
