= A Word from Our Sponsor =

1995 musical by Alan Ayckbourn and John Pattison

- Original language: English
- Written by: Alan Ayckbourn
- Characters: Harry; Janice; Gussie; Francis; Nonie; Rache; Earl; Valda; Valder
- Subject: Temptation

Premiere
- Date: 20 April 1995
- Place: Stephen Joseph Theatre (Westwood site), Scarborough
- Official website

A Word from Our Sponsor is a 1995 musical by Alan Ayckbourn and John Pattison. It was the final Ayckbourn play to be premièred at the Stephen Joseph Theatre's old Westwood site. It is about a vicar, who is tempted by the devil (Valda/Valder) offering a sponsorship deal for dubious return favours. This play was one of Ayckbourn's less successful works.

Just before the play was transferred to Minerva Theatre, Chichester, the production was interrupted by the death of a member of the cast, Sophie Winter (Gussie), who collapsed the afternoon before the final Scarborough performance and died shortly after. A memorial was made to her in the theatre, and a trust in her name was set up to sponsor new plays.
