= Brian Protheroe =

English singer/songwriter (born 1944)

- Born: 16 June 1944 (age 82); Salisbury, Wiltshire, England
- Occupations: Singer; songwriter; narrator; actor
- Agent: Lucia Pallaris
- Website: brianprotheroe.co.uk

Brian Protheroe (born 16 June 1944) is an English singer, songwriter, narrator and actor. He is best known for his first single, "Pinball", released in August 1974, which entered the UK Singles Chart at number 40 and reached a peak of number 22. He has been narrating the Channel 4 dating show First Dates since 2015.

== Career ==
=== Music ===
Protheroe was born in Salisbury, Wiltshire, England, on 16 June 1944, to a Welsh father and English mother. He joined a local church choir when he was twelve years old, and started piano lessons at about the same time. The music of Cliff Richard and the Shadows inspired him to start learning the guitar. He joined a rock band called the Coasters (not to be confused with the similarly titled United States outfit) as a lead singer in 1961, and also became a member of an amateur theatre group called the Studio Theatre.

Protheroe's first job was a library assistant for a year followed by three years as a student technician in a hospital pathology laboratory. Musical influences around this time were Elvis Presley, the Everly Brothers, Josh White, Big Bill Broonzy, Sonny Terry and Brownie McGhee, Dave Brubeck and the choral church music of Bach.

Protheroe joined the folk group Folk Blues Incorporated (FBI) when he was nineteen, while at this time listening to Bob Dylan and the Beatles. He came to London with FBI in 1965, and played in folk music clubs in and around London. In 1966, Protheroe began his career as an actor. His first job was with his local repertory theatre in Salisbury. He worked there for about seven months then spent the next five years in various theatre companies around Britain, developing his musical skills as well as becoming an experienced actor. In 1968, he worked for nearly two years in a theatre company in Lincoln, where he met Martin Duncan who was also a musician, writer and actor. Over the next few years they collaborated on various musical and artistic projects.

In 1973 Protheroe was playing the part of a pop singer in a play called Death on Demand, when a representative from Chrysalis Records heard a song he had written for the show. His first single, "Pinball", was released in August 1974, and it entered the UK Singles Chart at number 40 and reached a peak of number 22. Then followed by an album of the same name. The follow-up single "Fly Now" made Capital Radio's "Capital Countdown" chart.

This was followed over the next couple of years by two more albums – Pick Up and I/You (which featured Simon Phillips, as well as Ian Anderson and Barriemore Barlow of Jethro Tull). All three of Protheroe's original Chrysalis albums were produced by Del Newman and engineered by Richard Dodd. The song "Pick-Up"" was the centrepiece of a cabaret show called KinoTata which was put on by Martin Duncan, Protheroe's oft-times lyrical collaborator.

In 1997 Basta Records released a compilation album of the first three albums from the 1970s, with an additional disc of unreleased material in a box set, Brian's Big Box. The advent of the internet allowed for a resurgence in interest in his musical career. He released the collection Citysong in 2005. It was described as a "new single with seventeen bonus tracks and two movies". It included the new song "Holyoke Hotel" as well as two homemade videos. After remastering his original tapes at Abbey Road Studios, EMI studios released a greatest hits collection called Pinball and Other Stories in 2006.

=== Acting ===
A developing acting career found Protheroe, in 1976, starring in the London production of the rock musical, Leave Him to Heaven at the New London Theatre. Temporarily laying aside his career in music, he focused on theatre, television and film. He also has a small role in the 1978 film Superman as a co-pilot of Air Force One.

In 1982, he was cast in the BBC Two play Spider's Web by Agatha Christie, and in the following year played the role of Edward IV in the BBC Television Shakespeare productions of Henry VI, Part 2, Henry VI, Part 3 and Richard III. In 1984, he played in the West End musical Pump Boys and Dinettes on piano and vocals and percussion.

In 2002, Protheroe played the role of Gower in Adrian Noble's production of Pericles, Prince of Tyre. In 2007, he was cast as Saruman in the original stage musical version of The Lord of the Rings. Performances began at London's Theatre Royal, Drury Lane on 21 June 2007. Protheroe played his final performance at the end of his year contract in June 2008.

In 2012, he appeared in Hunted for BBC One and HBO.

His television work includes: Reilly, Ace of Spies, Gentlemen and Players, Lovejoy, Not a Penny More, Not a Penny Less (for which he also sang the title song), 55 Degrees North, North and South, Holby City, Love Soup, Midsomer Murders and Doctors. More recently he appeared in the eighth series of Spooks, in which he played the part of Samuel Walker, a senior CIA officer based in London.

== Discography ==
=== Albums ===
- Pinball (1974), Chrysalis
- Pick Up (1975), Chrysalis
- I/You (1976), Chrysalis
- Leave Him to Heaven (1976), Chrysalis
- Desert Road (2020), independent
- Hot Spot Melodies (2021), independent
- A Salisbury Boy (2023), independent
- The Last Serenade (2024), independent
- The Live One (2024), independent
- Comin up Midnight (2025), independent
- Still Walking (2026), independent

=== EPs ===
- The Cookie Jar (2018), independent

=== Singles ===
- "Pinball" (1974), Chrysalis
- "Pinball" / "Money Love" (1974), Chrysalis
- "Fly Now" (1974), Chrysalis
- "The Good Brand Band Song" (1975), Chrysalis
- "Running Through the City" (1974), Chrysalis
- "Scobo Queen" (1974), Chrysalis
- "Citysong" (2005), Basta
- "Venice" (digital only) (2012), independent
- "Broken Bridges" (digital only) (2013), independent
- "Sad Song" (digital only) (2016), independent
- "Night Traveller" (digital only) (2018), independent
- "Enjoy It" (remix) (digital only) (2019), independent
- "Fly Now" (digital only) (2020), independent

=== Compilations ===
- Brian's Big Box (1997), Basta (contains 'Pinball', 'Pick Up' and 'I/You' plus a bonus album 'Unreleased')
- Pinball and Other Stories (2006), EMI
- The Albums 1974–76 (2020), Cherry Red (contains 'Pinball', 'Pick Up' and 'I/You' plus a total of five bonus tracks)

== Selected filmography ==
- Superman (1978) – Co Pilot
- Strangers Episode Duty Roster (1978) – Ward
- A Nightingale Sang in Berkeley Square (1979) – Stan the Spinner
- Metroland (1997) – Woody (uncredited)
- Il gioco (1999)
- Royal Shakespeare Company: The Merchant of Venice (2015) – Aragon
- Litvinenko (2022) – Sir Robert Owen

== Video games ==
- SOMA (2015) – Terry Akers
- Final Fantasy XIV: Heavensward (2015) – Archbishop Thordan VII
- Final Fantasy XIV: Shadowbringers (2019) – Seto, Bismarck

== See also ==
- Albion Country Band
- List of performers on Top of the Pops
- Losing Louis
