= Norwegian Opera Company =

Opera company in Oslo, Norway (1950–1958)

The Norwegian Opera Company (Norwegian: Norsk Operaselskap A/S) was an opera company in Oslo, Norway.

The Norwegian Opera Company was established in 1950 by the Brunvoll brothers with the aim of having a fixed location as well as operating as a traveling company. The artistic director was the opera singer Jonas Brunvoll in collaboration with the Hungarian conductor István Pajor, and the impresario and administrative manager was Gunnar Brunvoll.

In its first year, the company received a government grant of NOK 15,000. It collaborated with New Norwegian Ballet (Ny Norsk Ballett) starting in 1953. The company was shut down in 1958; its fixed operations were merged into the newly established Norwegian National Opera and Ballet, and its travelling operations into the National Opera (Riksoperaen), the former touring component of the Norwegian National Opera.
