= The Park (play) =

1983 play by Botho Strauß

The Park (German: Der Park) is a 1983 play by the German writer Botho Strauß. It is loosely based on William Shakespeare's A Midsummer Night's Dream, with the characters moved to a contemporary German city.

Strauß wrote the play after a cancelled staging of A Midsummer Night's Dream for the Berliner Schaubühne. Strauß had worked on his own translation of the play, but decided to adapt it into a new play with a modern-day setting. The play was printed in 1983 and staged in three German versions the following year, by Dieter Bitterli in Freiburg, Dieter Dorn at the Munich Kammerspiele and Peter Stein at the Berliner Schaubühne.

It was the basis for the 1992 opera Parken by the composer Hans Gefors.

== Reception ==
Paul Taylor of The Independent reviewed a 1995 production in London, and wrote that "the malaise of these contemporary characters is altogether more existential than anything suffered in the Dream, an inwardly-turned madness rather than the healthier lunacy of love". He described how "thematic motifs from the Shakespeare surface in a provocatively warped way" and called the play "a work in which the spirit of Shakespeare's comedy leaks stirringly (if, in the end, impotently) into the senses of the contemporary personnel", summarizing it as "a strangely haunting experience".
