= Raymond Gubbay =

British music promoter

Raymond Jonathan Gubbay, CBE (born 2 April 1946) is a British impresario, active primarily in the UK and Europe. He has worked with classical artists including Anna Netrebko, Jonas Kaufmann, Bryn Terfel, Joseph Calleja, Rolando Villazon, Yehudi Menuhin, James Galway, Henry Mancini, Victor Borge, and Kiri te Kanawa. In dance, he has co-produced seasons by New York City Ballet, Mark Morris Dance Group, Carlos Acosta, Sylvie Guillem, Bejart Ballet, Stuttgart Ballet, and American Ballet Theatre.

In partnership with the Royal Albert Hall, Gubbay staged arena-scale productions of La bohème, Tosca, Carmen, Aida and Madam Butterfly, Romeo and Juliet, The Sleeping Beauty, and Swan Lake, in partnership with English National Ballet.

Gubbay is an Honorary Fellow of both the Royal Academy of Music and Trinity College of Music, London. He is also a fellow of the Royal Society of Arts. He was appointed a CBE in June 2001 and currently resides in London.

== Early years ==
Gubbay was born in London. He grew up in a middle-class Jewish household, the son of an accountant. In 1966, he founded Raymond Gubbay Ltd. and began presenting concerts featuring three or four singers and a pianist at small halls and theatres. Gubbay began promoting in London in 1968, first on the South Bank (at the newly opened Queen Elizabeth Hall) and later at the Royal Festival Hall. He also promotes at the Royal Albert Hall in the early 1970s.

The opening of the Barbican Centre in 1982 allowed him to expand the number of London concerts. His "Teddy Bears" concerts introduced young children to the concert hall in an informal and light-hearted way. At the Royal Festival Hall, he has presented concerts, including the four-concert Fiftieth Birthday series by Itzhak Perlman.

In December 1991, Gubbay presented a Royal Opera production of Turandot at Wembley Arena. More recently he has co-presented in-the-round opera and ballet productions at the Royal Albert Hall including La Bohème (directed by Francesca Zambello), Carmen, Madam Butterfly, Tosca, and Aida (all directed by David Freeman), Cavalleria Rusticana, and Pagliacci; and, with English National Ballet, Swan Lake, Romeo and Juliet, and The Sleeping Beauty.

In London's West End, his productions include: The Ratepayers and The Metropolitan Mikado, Ute Lemper in seasons at the Queen's Theatre and the Savoy Theatre, Circus Oz and Bejart Ballet at Sadlers Wells, the Bolshoi Ballet at the Theatre Royal, Drury Lane, the D'Oyly Carte Opera Company in several seasons of Gilbert and Sullivan at the Savoy Theatre, and Peter Pan, The Marriage of Figaro, and The Barber of Seville at the Savoy. At the Royal Festival Hall, he has presented seasons of Peter Pan, A Christmas Carol, Stanislavsky Ballet, Follies, On Your Toes, and Circus Oz.

In 2008, DEAG Classics AG, a subsidiary of Deutsche Entertainment AG and Sony Music Classical, acquired a shareholding in Raymond Gubbay Ltd. In 2015, the company increased its stake in Raymond Gubbay Ltd from 75.1% to 100%. Gubbay departed Raymond Gubbay Ltd in 2016.

On 28 October 2009, Gubbay was presented with a BASCA Gold Badge Award in recognition of his unique contribution to music.
